= Bucky Pizzarelli discography =

The following discography lists albums by Bucky Pizzarelli.

== Bucky Pizzarelli albums ==
Released	Album	Notes	Label
2007-04-10	Generations	with John Pizzarelli	Arbors
2007-02-13	Five for Freddie	Freddie Green tribute	Arbors
2007-10-16	Don't Blame Me	with Frank Vignola	Acoustic Disc
1999-09-14	April Kisses		Arbors
2006-06-27	Doug and Bucky	with Doug Jernigan	Flying Fish
2006	Around the World in 80 Years	with John Pizzarelli	Victoria
2005-07-19	Moonglow	with Frank Vignola	Hyena
2004-05-25	Hot Club of 52nd Street	with Howard Alden	Chesky
2001-07-24	Swing Live	CD version	Chesky
2001-06-08	Twogether	with John Pizzarelli	Victoria
2001-06-03	Passionate Guitars	with John Pizzarelli	LRC
2001-06-05	One Morning In May		Arbors
2001-01-01	Sonatina		Victoria
2000	Italian Intermezzo	with Ken Peplowski	Menus and Music
1999-09-14	April Kisses		Arbors
1999-05-04	Passion Guitars	with John Pizzarelli	Groove Jams
1999-02-09	Contrasts	with John Pizzarelli	Arbors
1998-08-05	The Red Door: Remember Zoot Sims	with Scott Hamilton	Concord
1996-07-23	Solos and Duets	with John Pizzarelli	Original Jazz Classics
1996-05-14	Live at the Vineyard Theatre	with John Pizzarelli	Challenge
1995-08-01	Nirvana	with John Pizzarelli	Delta
1988-01-01	Guitar Quintet	Bill Challis arrangements	Audiophile
1986-01-01	Solo Flight		Stash
1984-03-01	Swinging Stevens		Stash
1982-08-25	Café Pierre Trio		Monmouth
1979-07-15	Duet	with Stéphane Grappelli	Ahead (France)
1979-01-01	2 X 7 = Pizzarelli		
1978-01-01	Doug & Bucky	with Doug Jernigan	Flying Fish
1977-01-01	Buck and Bud	with Bud Freeman	Flying Dutchman
1977-01-01	Bucky's Bunch		Monmouth
1975-01-01	Nightwings		Flying Dutchman
1974	Nirvana	with Zoot Sims and special guest Buddy Rich	Groove Merchant
1972-05-03	Plays Bix Beiderbecke Arrangements by Bill Challis		Monmouth
1972-05-03	Green Guitar Blues		Monmouth Evergreen
1961-01-09	Music Minus Many Men		Savoy

=== With others ===
This section serves two purposes. It is for Bucky Pizzarelli efforts on the albums of others, and it is also designated for ensembles where the album is attributed to more than two musicians. For instance, the above section has collaborative efforts also, but in each instance Pizzarelli is named as either a leader or co-leader.

Released	Album	Artist(s)	Label
2007-06-05	A Bluish Bag	Stanley Turrentine	Blue Note
2007-01-23	Last First Kiss	Tony DeSare	Telarc
2007-01-09	Speaking of Love	Scott Whitfield	Summit
2007-01-01	That Thing Called Love	Karen Egert	Karen Egert Records
2007-01-01	Attractions	Cynthia Sayer	Plunk
2006-11-21	Recovered Treasures	Ruby Braff	Jump
2006-07-18	Dear Mr. Sinatra	John Pizzarelli	Telarc
2006-04-13	Oh' Lady Be Good	Michele Ramo & Jerry Bruno	Moonboat & Ramo Music
2006	Lost Songs of 1936	Dick Hyman & Jay Leonhart	Victoria
2006	Three Legends Live at the Division Street Grill	Carmen Leggio & Bill Crow	Leggio
2005-11-15	Let Me Sing	Annie Ross	Consolidated Artists Productions
2005-05-25	Want You	Tony DeSare	Telarc
2005-02-01	You Brought a New Kind of Love	Ruby Braff	Arbors
2005-01-01	The Rules of the Road	Catherine Dupuis	Bearheart
2005-01-01	Now!	Marlene Ver Planck	Audiophile
2003-05-12	Tony's Tunes	John Bunch Trio	Chiaroscuro
2002-04-01	You Inspire Me	Diane Hubka	Vocal Sound of Jazz
2001-09-04	Manhattan Swing: A Visit With the Duke	John Bunch & Jay Leonhart	Arbors
2001	Christmas Time Is Here	Monday Off	Victoria
2000-10-24	The Satchmo Legacy	Benny Bailey	Enja
1998-04-07	Just Among Friends	Gerry Beaudoin Trio	Linn
1989	The Rhythm Encounters with (meets) Slam Stewart and Red Norvo		Stash Records
1987	The Jazz Banjo of Cynthia Sayer; Volume 1 & More Jazz Banjo Volume 2	Cynthia Sayer	Cynthia Sayer Records
1983-01-01	Love Songs: Mexico/South America	Tony Mottola	Verve
1981-01-01	Evolution	Gene Bertoncini	Evolution
1978	The Sweetest Sounds	Rune Gustafsson and Zoot Sims	Pablo Today
1976	Stomp Off Let's Go	Sonny Stitt	Flying Dutchman
1974	Ms. Jazz	Carmen McRae	Groove Merchant
1970	Cornucopia	Dizzy Gillespie	Solid State
1968	Summertime	Paul Desmond	A&M/CTI
1967	The Herbie Mann String Album	Herbie Mann	Atlantic
1967	Penny Lane & Time	Kai Winding	Verve
1967	For Once in My Life	Sylvia Syms	Prestige
1966	Rain Forest	Walter Wanderley	Verve
1965	Sylvia Is!	Sylvia Syms	Prestige
1967	Pat Williams: Think	Pat Williams	Verve
1965	Goodies	J. J. Johnson	RCA Victor
1963	Love Shout	Etta Jones	Prestige
1963	Neapolitan Nights	Willis Jackson	Prestige
1962	Bad! Bossa Nova	Gene Ammons	Prestige
1962	Roman Guitar	Tony Mottola	Command
1962	Roman Guitar, Volume 2	Tony Mottola	Command
1959	Redhead	Rex Stewart	Design
