= Ray Kennedy (pianist) =

American jazz pianist, composer, and arranger

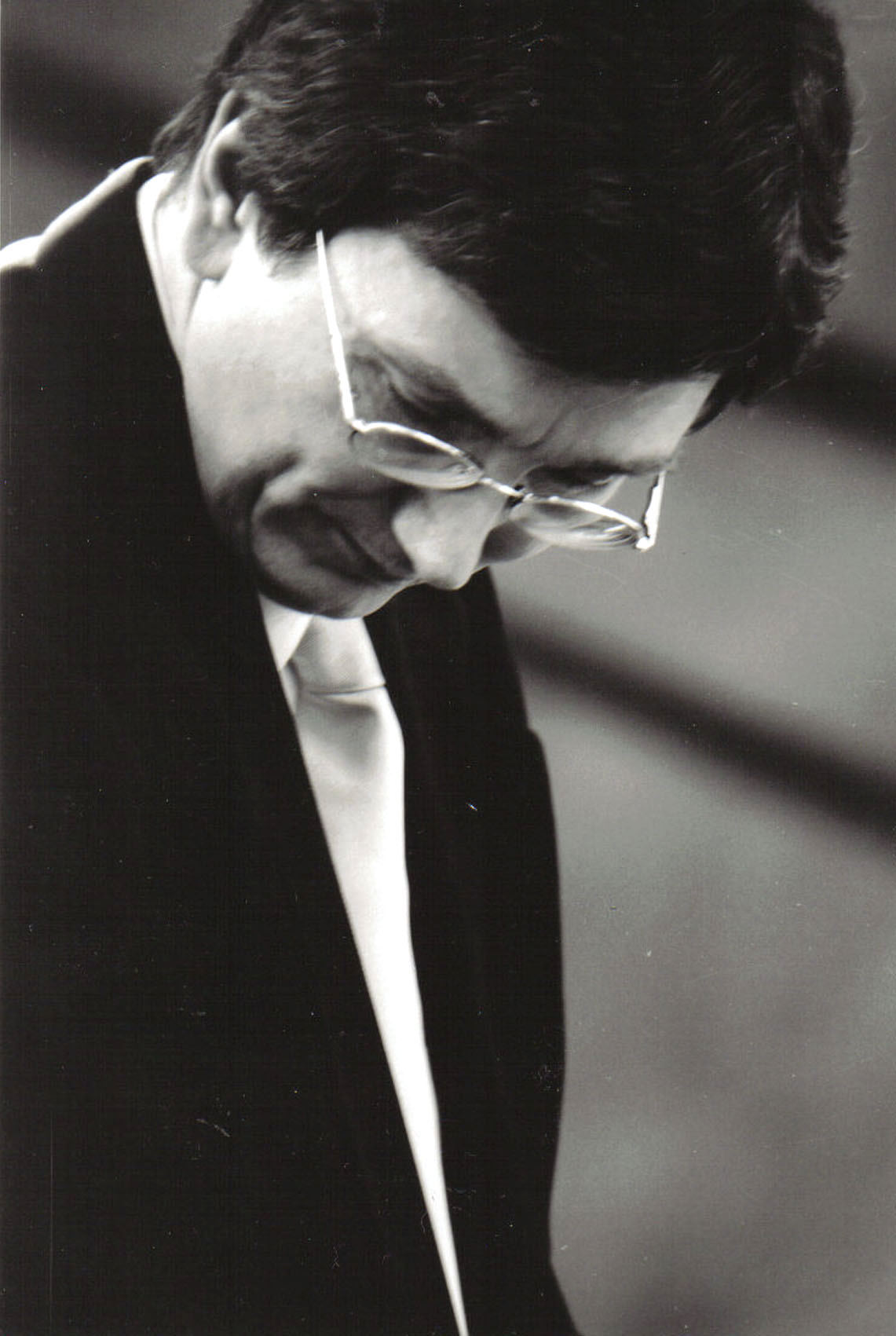

Background information
- Born: January 6, 1957; Maplewood, Missouri, U.S.
- Died: May 28, 2015 (aged 58) New York City, New York, U.S.
- Genres: Jazz
- Occupations: Musician, composer, arranger
- Instrument: Piano
- Formerly of: John Pizzarelli
- Website: raykennedy.com

Raymond Huston Kennedy Jr. (January 6, 1957 – May 28, 2015) was an American jazz pianist, composer, and arranger. He was a member of John Pizzarelli's trio for more than a decade and recorded more than 10 albums under his own name.

== Life and career ==
Kennedy was born and grew up in Maplewood, Missouri, in 1957. His father was a bandleader, trumpeter and vocalist in the 1930s and 1940s in St. Louis. His mother worked in the Maplewood music store that his parents owned. Kennedy had two siblings: Tom, who became a bassist; and Wanda, who also became a musician. With his brother, he formed The Ray Kennedy Trio at the age of 13, and they played together, including with their sister as vocalist, for five years. According to a biographer of Ruby Braff, Ray and his brother made a recording together in 1972.

Kennedy moved to New York City in his early twenties. He was pianist and arranger for the John Pizzarelli Trio for almost 13 years, after joining in 1993. With the John Pizzarelli Trio, Kennedy played with the New York Pops and Boston Pops orchestras, played for Broadway and off-Broadway productions, and toured internationally. Kennedy first recorded with Pizzarelli in 1994, after making two recordings for Randy Sandke. In 1997 he was part of the cast for the musical Dream. In 2003 he recorded a piano duo album with Dick Hyman.

Around 2005, Kennedy, according to John Pizzarelli, "began expressing a desire to get off the road and spend more time with his family". Kennedy developed multiple sclerosis symptoms in 2006. His career had ended by 2013, and he was living in a nursing home. Kennedy died at Mount Sinai Hospital, New York City, on May 28, 2015. He was survived by his wife, Eve Langner, and two daughters, Lauren and Brielle.

== Playing style ==
According to Michael Sorkin of the St. Louis Post-Dispatch, "Kennedy was known for his finger technique and his ability to swing and improvise versions of well-known jazz works."

== Discography ==
An asterisk (*) indicates that the year is that of release.

=== As leader/co-leader ===
| Year recorded | Title | Label | Personnel/Notes |
|---|---|---|---|
| | I'm Beginning to See the Light | Victoria | With Bucky Pizzarelli, John Pizzarelli, Martin Pizzarelli, Ray Brown (bass), Jeff Hamilton (drums) |
| 2000* | The Sound of St. Louis | Victoria | |
| 2003 | What Is There to Say? | Victoria | Co-led with Dick Hyman; duo, with Hyman (piano) |
| 2005* | The Swing Kings | Victoria | Co-led with Bucky Pizzarelli; with Pizzarelli (guitar), Ken Peplowski (clarinet), Chuck Redd (vibraphone), Martin Pizzarelli (bass), Tony Tedesco (drums) |
| 2005 | Mozart in Jazz | Camerata | Trio, with Tom Kennedy (bass), Miles Vandiver (drums) |
| 2006 | Plays the Music of Arthur Schwartz | Arbors | Quartet, with Joe Cohn (guitar), Tom Kennedy (bass), Miles Vandiver (drums) |
| 2006 | Bach in Jazz | Camerata | Trio, with Tom Kennedy (bass), Miles Vandiver (drums) |
| 2007 | Soft Winds | Camerata | Trio, with Tom Kennedy (bass), Lewis Nash (drums) |
| 2007 | Baroque in Jazz | Camerata | Trio, with Tom Kennedy (bass), Miles Vandiver (drums) |
| 2008 | Classic in Jazz | Camerata | Trio, with Tom Kennedy (bass), Miles Vandiver (drums) |
| 2008 | Beethoven in Jazz | Camerata | Trio, with Tom Kennedy (bass), Miles Vandiver (drums) |
| 2009 | 癒しジャズ | Camerata | with Tom Kennedy (bass), Miles Vandiver (drums), Sumiko Fukatsu (flute), Howard Alden (guitar) |

=== As sideman ===
| Year recorded | Leader | Title | Label |
|---|---|---|---|
| c. 1977 | Kenny Rice | The Kenny Rice and Richard Martin Quartet Featuring Nat Adderley | Valley Recorder |
| 1990 | Dave Weckl | Master Plan | GRP |
| 1990 | Randy Sandke | Stampede | Jazzology |
| 1993 | Randy Sandke | I Hear Music | Concord Jazz |
| 1993 | John Pizzarelli | Naturally | |
| 1994* | John Pizzarelli | New Standards | |
| 1994 | John Pizzarelli | Dear Mr. Cole | Jive |
| 1995 | John Pizzarelli | After Hours | Jive |
| 1995–98 | Harry Allen | Harry Allen Meets the John Pizzarelli Trio | RCA |
| 1996* | John Pizzarelli | Let's Share Christmas | |
| 1997* | Bucky Pizzarelli and John Pizzarelli | Passion Guitars | |
| 1997 | John Pizzarelli | Our Love Is Here to Stay | |
| 1998* | John Pizzarelli | Meets the Beatles | |
| 1999* | John Pizzarelli | P.S. Mr. Cole | |
| 1999 | John Pizzarelli | Kisses in the Rain | Telarc |
| 2000 | John Pizzarelli | Let There Be Love | Telarc |
| 2002 | Ruby Braff | Relaxing at the Penthouse | Victoria |
| 2002 | Ruby Braff | C'est Magnifique! | Arbors |
| 2003* | John Pizzarelli | Live at Birdland | Telarc |
| 2003* | Jessica Molaskey | A Good Day | PS Classics |
| 2003 | John Pizzarelli | Bossa Nova | Telarc |
| 2003 | Buddy DeFranco | Cookin' the Books | Arbors |
| 2004* | Martin Pizzarelli | Triple Play | Victoria |
| 2004 | John Pizzarelli | Knowing You | Telarc |
| 2007 | Harry Allen | Down for the Count | |
