= Rockin' in Rhythm: A Tribute to Duke Ellington =

Studio album by John Pizzarelli
- Released: February 23, 2010
- Genre: Jazz
- Length: 49:40
- Label: Telarc
- Producer: John Pizzarelli; Robert Friedrich

John Pizzarelli chronology
With a Song in My Heart (2008)	Rockin' in Rhythm: A Tribute to Duke Ellington (2010)	Double Exposure (2012)

Professional ratings
Review scores
Source	Rating
AllMusic	3.5/5 stars

Rockin' in Rhythm: A Tribute to Duke Ellington is an album by jazz guitarist John Pizzarelli celebrating the music of Duke Ellington.

== Track listing ==
1. "In a Mellow Tone" (Duke Ellington, Milt Gabler) – 4:10
2. "East St. Louis Toodle-Oo/Don't Get Around Much Anymore" (Ellington, Bubber Miley, Bob Russell) – 3:39
3. "Satin Doll" (Ellington, Johnny Mercer, Billy Strayhorn – 3:37
4. "C Jam Blues" (Ellington) – 7:57
5. "In My Solitude" (Eddie DeLange, Ellington, Irving Mills) – 3:50
6. "Just Squeeze Me" (Ellington, Lee Raines) – 3:19
7. "Perdido" (Ervin Drake, Hans Lengsfelder, Juan Tizol) – 4:09
8. "All Too Soon" (Ellington, Carl Sigman) – 3:08
9. "I'm Beginning to See the Light" (Ellington, Don George, Johnny Hodges, Harry James) – 4:05
10. "Love Scene" (Ellington) – 3:46
11. "I Got It Bad (and That Ain't Good)" (Ellington, Paul Francis Webster) – 3:45
12. "Cotton Tail"/"Rockin' in Rhythm" (Harry Carney, Ellington, Mills) – 4:00

== Personnel ==
- John Pizzarelli – guitar, vocals
- Tony Kadlech – trumpet
- John Mosca – trombone, alto horn
- Andy Fusco – alto saxophone, clarinet
- Harry Allen – tenor saxophone, 4, 11
- Kenny Berger – baritone saxophone, bass clarinet
- Larry Fuller – piano, 2
- Bucky Pizzarelli – guitar, 3, 5, 8, 11
- Martin Pizzarelli – double bass
- Tony Tedesco – drums
- Kurt Elling – vocals, 7
- Jessica Molaskey – vocals, 7
- Aaron Weinstein – violin, 2, 4, 5
