= Midnight McCartney =

Studio album by John Pizzarelli
- Released: September 11, 2015
- Studio: The Jacob Burns Film Center and Media Arts Lab, Pleasantville, NY
- Genre: Jazz; vocal jazz
- Length: 49:44
- Label: Concord
- Producer: John Pizzarelli; Robert Friedrich

John Pizzarelli chronology
John Pizzarelli Salutes Johnny Mercer: Live at Birdland (2015)	Midnight McCartney (2015)	Sinatra & Jobim @ 50 (2017)

Midnight McCartney is a tribute album by John Pizzarelli to Paul McCartney, including tracks from Wings. It was released in 2015 with Concord.

According to the album's press release, Paul McCartney suggested John Pizzarelli perform tracks from his canon, and offered the title. Pizzarelli had previously performed Beatles songs in his 1996 album Meets the Beatles.

John's wife Jessica Molaskey, daughter Madeleine Pizzarelli, father Bucky Pizzarelli, and brother Martin Pizzarelli all performed on the album.

== Reception ==
Professional ratings
Review scores
Source	Rating
AllMusic	4/5 stars

Writing for AllMusic, Stephen Thomas Erlewine praised the source material, but commented the "key to the record's success is Pizzarelli himself, who delivers upon the laid-back promise of the title but is savvier than he needed to be, which is why Midnight McCartney satisfies."

Christopher Loudon wrote for JazzTimes that "the set’s not all midnight lace. Indeed, lovely as everything wrapped in Pizzarelli’s trademark silken lilt is, the more adventurous selections are more interesting."

The Times music critic Chris Pearson described the album as "delightful."

In an interview with Pizzarelli, James Wood from Guitar World commented the tracks were "all tastefully done in Pizzarelli’s trademark style."

== Track listing ==
No.	Title	Writer(s)	Length
1.	"Silly Love Songs"	Paul & Linda McCartney	3:53
2.	"My Love"	Paul & Linda McCartney	4:26
3.	"Heart of the Country"	Paul & Linda McCartney	3:11
4.	"Coming Up"	Paul McCartney	3:56
5.	"No More Lonely Nights"	Paul McCartney	5:07
6.	"Warm and Beautiful"	Paul & Linda McCartney	3:33
7.	"Hi, Hi, Hi"	Paul & Linda McCartney	2:53
8.	"Junk"	Paul & Linda McCartney	3:38
9.	"My Valentine"	Paul McCartney	3:39
10.	"Let 'Em In"	Paul & Linda McCartney	2:53
11.	"Some People Never Know"	Paul & Linda McCartney	3:23
12.	"Maybe I'm Amazed"	Paul McCartney	4:00
13.	"Wonderful Christmastime"	Paul McCartney	4:17

== Personnel ==
=== Musicians ===
- John Pizzarelli – guitar, primary artist
- Katherine Fink – flute (alto)
- Pamela Sklar – flute (Alto)
- Tony Kadleck – trumpet
- John Mosca – trombone
- Andy Fusco – sax (alto)
- Harry Allen – saxophone (tenor), soloist
- Chris Cardona – viola
- Mairi Dorman Phaneuf – cello
- Bucky Pizzarelli – guitar (rhythm), soloist
- Paul Woodiel – violin
- Robin Zeh – violin
- Hélio Alves – piano
- Larry Goldings – organ, piano
- Konrad Paszkudzki – piano, bass
- Martin Pizzarelli – bass
- Duduka Dafonseca – drums, percussion
- Kevin Kanner – drums
- Don Sebesky – orchestration
- Michael McDonald – primary artist, vocals
- Jessica Molaskey – vocals (background)
- Madeleine Pizzarelli – vocals (background)
- Linda McCartney – composer
- Paul McCartney – composer

=== Support ===
- John Pizzarelli – arranger
- Chris Byars – copyist
- Holger Eckstein – photography
- Larry Goldings – arranger
- Rachel Gutek – design
- Jessica Molaskey – producer
- Bill Moss – engineer, mastering, mixing
