= Let There Be Love (John Pizzarelli album) =

Let there Be Love

Studio album by John Pizzarelli
- Released: November 28, 2000
- Recorded: July 7–9, 2000
- Genre: Swing; jazz standards
- Label: Telarc

John Pizzarelli chronology
Two Family House (2000)	Let there Be Love (2000)	Twogether (2001)

Professional ratings
Review scores
Source	Rating
AllMusic	4/5 stars
The Penguin Guide to Jazz Recordings	3.5/4 stars

Let There Be Love is a jazz studio album by John Pizzarelli. He was backed by his brother Martin Pizzarelli on double-bass and Ray Kennedy on piano.

== Track listing ==
1. "Let There Be Love"
2. "I'm Putting All My Eggs in One Basket"
3. "These Foolish Things"
4. "All I Saw Was You"
5. "Everything I Have Is Yours"
6. "Stompin' at the Savoy"
7. "Follow"
8. "Our Little Secret"
9. "You'll Never Know"
10. "I Don't Know Why (I Just Do)"
11. "Our Love Rolls On"
12. "Just One More Chance"
13. "Lucky Charm"
14. "Da Vinci's Eyes"
15. "What Is There to Say"

== Personnel ==
- John Pizzarelli – guitar, vocal
- Martin Pizzarelli – double-bass
- Ray Kennedy – piano
- Tony Tedesco – brushes on phone book
- Harry Allen – tenor saxophone (4, 5, 14)
- Jesse Levy – cello (14)
- Ken Peplowski – clarinet (6, 14)
- Bucky Pizzarelli – guitar (10, 12)
