= I'm Hip (Please Don't Tell My Father) =

Studio album by John Pizzarelli
- Released: May 1983
- Recorded: May 1983
- Genre: Jazz
- Length: 56:53
- Producer: Bernard Brightman

John Pizzarelli chronology
I'm Hip (Please Don't Tell My Father) (1983)	Hit That Jive, Jack! (1985)

I'm Hip (Please Don't Tell My Father) is the debut album by American jazz guitarist John Pizzarelli.

== Reception ==
Professional ratings
Review scores
Source	Rating
AllMusic	3/5 stars

Writing two decades after the album's release, Scott Yanow of AllMusic commented that Pizzarelli "never had a strong voice, but his charm and likable personality usually overcame his vocal shortcomings". He concluded the album was "[a]n interesting early effort."

== Track listing ==
Side one
No.	Title	Writer(s)	Length
1.	"Route 66"	Bobby Troup	3:17
2.	"I'm Hip"	Dave Frishberg, Bob Dorough	2:57
3.	"A Man with One Million Dollars"	James Cavanaugh, Paul Cunningham, Guy Wood	2:58
4.	"Straighten Up and Fly Right"	Irving Mills, Nat King Cole	2:17
5.	"Popsicle Toes"	Michael Franks	3:31

Side two
No.	Title	Writer(s)	Length
1.	"I Like Jersey Best"	Phil Bernardi, Joe Cosgriff	4:16
2.	"Have Another One, Not Me"	Joe Mooney	3:38
3.	"For Sentimental Reasons"	Deek Watson, William Best	2:51
4.	"The River Is Blue"	Pizzarelli	3:17
5.	"Here's Looking at You Kid"	Pizzarelli	2:33

== Personnel ==
Musicians

- John Pizzarelli – guitar, vocals
- Bucky Pizzarelli – guitar
- Russ Kassoff – piano
- Jerry Bruno – bass guitar

Production

- Bernard Brightman – executive producer
- Gary Pozner – engineer
- Bill Farrar – liner notes
