= Hit That Jive, Jack! =

Studio album by John Pizzarelli
- Released: June 25, 1985
- Studio: Lobel Studios, West New York, New Jersey
- Genre: Jazz
- Length: 30:51
- Label: Stash
- Producer: Bernard Brightman; Bucky Pizzarelli

John Pizzarelli chronology
I'm Hip (Please Don't Tell My Father) (1983)	Hit That Jive, Jack! (1985)	Sing! Sing! Sing! (1987)

Hit That Jive, Jack! is the second studio album led by jazz guitarist and singer John Pizzarelli, released in 1985 with Stash Records. The title is taken from the Nat King Cole song, which he covered on the album.

== Reception ==
Professional ratings
Review scores
Source	Rating
AllMusic	2/5 stars

Scott Yanow of AllMusic commented that "Pizzarelli's singing was already distinctive and his guitar playing quite swinging, but roughly half of the songs on this CD reissue use pop or funk rhythms" on account of him "not quite [finding] his niche yet". He concluded "the uneven material and arrangements make this a lightweight effort."

== Track listing ==
Side one
No.	Title	Writer(s)	Length
1.	"Hit That Jive, Jack!"	John Alston, Skeets Tolbert	2:53
2.	"Better Run Before It's Spring"	John Pizzarelli, Linda Rose	4:10
3.	"The Frim-Fram Sauce"	Joe Ricardel, Redd Evans	2:45
4.	"Davenport Blues"	John Pizzarelli	3:02
5.	"Racing With The Moon"	Pauline Pope, Vaughn Monroe	3:31

Side two
No.	Title	Writer(s)	Length
1.	"Nobody's Heart"	Richard Rodgers, Lorenz Hart	3:37
2.	"This Will Make You Laugh"	Irene Higginbotham	3:12
3.	"Haven't We Met"	Kenny Rankin	2:21
4.	"Baby, Baby, All The Time"	Bobby Troup	3:02
5.	"You're Nobody Till Somebody Loves You"	Larry Stock, Russ Morgan	2:18

== Personnel ==
- John Pizzarelli – arranger, composer, guitar, primary artist, vocals
- Bucky Pizzarelli – guest artist, guitar, primary artist, producer
- Bernard Brightman – executive producer
- Dave McKenna – guest artist, piano
- Jerry Bruno – bass
- Gary Haase – bass
- Steve Ferrera – drums
- Butch Miles – drums
- Hugh McCracken – harmonica

Support

- Richard Ables – A&R
- Will Friedwald – liner notes
- Collin Kellogg – art direction
- Alice Melzer – photography
- Gary Posner – engineer
