= The Best of Bucky and John Pizzarelli =

Greatest hits album by Bucky Pizzarelli and John Pizzarelli
- Released: February 28, 2006
- Recorded: November 8, 1993 to January 15, 1997
- Genre: Swing; Jazz
- Label: LRC Ltd.

The Best of Bucky and John Pizzarelli is a compilation album of song choices selected from the combined careers of Bucky Pizzarelli and John Pizzarelli from the 1990s, released in 2006 by LRC, Ltd.

== Track listing ==
Disc 1

1. Besame Mucho
2. Triste
3. One Note Samba
4. Girl from Ipanema
5. Line for Lyons
6. I Found a New Baby
7. Orchids in Moonlight
8. Maybe This Summer
9. S'wonderful
10. Day in the Life of a Fool
11. Meditation

Disc 2

1. Song Is You
2. I Dream Too Much
3. Why Do I Love You
4. Smoke Gets in Your Eyes
5. Can't Help Lovin Dat Man
6. Sure Thing
7. Pick Yourself Up
8. Bill
9. Yesterdays
10. Why Was I Born
11. I'm Old Fashioned
12. All the Things You Are
13. Remind Me
14. Nobody Else But Me
15. Azure'te

Disc 3

1. Sing Sing Sing
2. Little World Called Home
3. Pick Yourself Up
4. Nuages
5. Honeysuckle Rose
6. Willow Weep for Me
7. Tangerine
8. Medley: It's Been a Long Time/Don't Take Your Love from Me
9. Two Funky People
10. Come Rain or Come Shine
11. Stompin' at the Savoy

== Personnel ==
- Bucky Pizzarelli – guitar
- John Pizzarelli – vocals, guitar
