= Contrasts (Bucky Pizzarelli and John Pizzarelli album) =

Studio album by Bucky Pizzarelli & John Pizzarelli
- Released: February 9, 1999
- Recorded: July 1, 1998
- Genre: Swing
- Length: 62:41
- Label: Arbors

Bucky Pizzarelli chronology
Solos and Duets (1996)	Contrasts (1999)	Passion Guitars (1999)

John Pizzarelli chronology
Meets the Beatles (1998)	Contrasts (1999)	P.S. Mr. Cole (1999)

Professional ratings
Review scores
Source	Rating
AllMusic	4.5/5 stars

Contrasts is a jazz album by Bucky Pizzarelli and his son John Pizzarelli, released in 1999. The album features both an acoustic guitar and an electric 7 string guitar, a trademark of Bucky Pizzarelli.

== Track listing ==
1. "Three Little Words" – 3:54
2. "Coquette" – 2:57
3. "Jersey Bounce" – 6:51
4. "The Bad and the Beautiful" – 2:27
5. "Three Minute Samba" – 2:38
6. "Contrasts" – 6:02
7. "Test Pilot" – 2:35
8. "I Hadn't Anyone Till You/The Very Thought of You" – 4:30
9. "The Devil and the Deep Blue Sea" – 5:37
10. "Two Funky People" – 6:38
11. "Stage Fright" – 2:54
12. "Phantasmagoria" – 4:47
13. "My Romance" – 1:47
14. "Emily" – 4:39
15. "Guess I'll Go Back Home This Summer" – 2:16
16. "For Whom the Bell Tolls" – 2:09

== Personnel ==
- Bucky Pizzarelli – guitar
- John Pizzarelli – guitar
