= Knowing You =

Studio album by John Pizzarelli
- Released: March 22, 2005
- Recorded: September 21–24, 2004
- Genre: Swing; jazz; vocal jazz
- Label: Telarc Records

John Pizzarelli chronology
Bossa Nova (2004)	Knowing You (2005)	Just Friends (2006)

Professional ratings
Review scores
Source	Rating
AllMusic	4.5/5 stars
The Penguin Guide to Jazz Recordings	3/4 stars

Knowing You is a 2005 album by jazz singer and swing jazz guitarist John Pizzarelli. The album is composed of primarily jazz and pop standards and received a very favorable review at AllMusic by music critic Matt Collar.

== Track listing ==
1. "Coffee, Black"
2. "New Sun in the Sky"
3. "Ain't That a Kick in the Head?"
4. "The Shadow of Your Smile"
5. "Pick Yourself Up"
6. "Knowing You"
7. "God Only Knows"
8. "Quality Time"
9. "Eastwood Lane"
10. "I Just Found Out About Love"
11. "Say It (Over and Over Again)"
12. "That Face"
13. "How Long Has This Been Going On?"
14. "The First Hint of Autumn"
15. "If It's the Last Thing I Do"

== Personnel ==
- John Pizzarelli – vocals, guitar
- Ray Kennedy – piano
- Martin Pizzarelli – double-bass
- Harry Allen – tenor saxophone
- Jessica Molaskey – vocals
- Larry Goldings – piano
- Tony Tedesco – drums
