= Naturally (John Pizzarelli album) =

Studio album by John Pizzarelli
- Released: 1993
- Genre: Jazz; swing
- Length: 50:28
- Label: RCA, Novus
- Producer: Ken Greengrass; Bucky Pizzarelli

John Pizzarelli chronology
All of Me (1992)	Naturally (1993)	Dear Mr. Cole (1994)

Professional ratings
Review scores
Source	Rating
AllMusic	4/5 stars

Naturally is a studio album by jazz singer and guitarist John Pizzarelli, accompanied by Martin Pizzarelli and Ken Levinsky (pianist). Also on the album is a large horn section with Clark Terry, and his father Bucky Pizzarelli on rhythm guitar.

== Track listing ==
1. "Splendid Splinter" (John Pizzarelli) - (4:01)
2. "I'm Confessin' (That I Love You)" (Doc Daugherty, Al J. Neiburg, Ellis Reynolds) - (3:48)
3. "Oh, Lady Be Good" (George Gershwin, Ira Gershwin) - (3:51)
4. "When I Grow Too Old to Dream" (Oscar Hammerstein II, Sigmund Romberg) - (3:30)
5. "Baby Medley: Gee Baby Ain't I Good to You/Baby, Baby, All the Time" (Neal Hefti, Andy Razaf, Don Redman, Bobby Troup) - (5:16)
6. "Seven on Charlie" (Dick Lieb, John Pizzarelli) - (3:18)
7. "Slappin' the Cakes on Me" (Dave Frishberg) - (3:37)
8. "Nuages" (Django Reinhardt) - (4:47)
9. "I Cried for You" (Gus Amheim, Arthur Freed, Abe Lyman) - (4:00)
10. "Naturally" (Ken Levinsky, John Pizzarelli, Martin Pizzarelli) - (2:51)
11. "You Stepped Out of a Dream" (Nacio Herb Brown, Gus Kahn) - (3:03)
12. "Headed Out to Vera's" (Grover Kemble, John Pizzarelli) - (2:31)
13. "Your Song Is With Me" (John Pizzarelli) - (5:55)

== Personnel ==
- John Pizzarelli – vocals, guitar
- Ken Levinsky – piano
- Bucky Pizzarelli – guitar, arrangement
- Martin Pizzarelli – double bass
- Dick Lieb – conductor, arrangement
- Clark Terry – trumpet, flugelhorn
- John Frosk – trumpet
- Tony Kadleck – trumpet
- Mike Ponella – trumpet
- Bob Alexander – trombone
- Wayne Andre – trombone
- Mark Patterson – trombone
- Paul Faulise – bass trombone
- Walt Levinsky – alto saxophone
- Frank Griffith – alto saxophone
- Harry Allen – tenor saxophone
- Scott Robinson – tenor saxophone
- Jack Stuckey – baritone saxophone
- Dom Cortese – accordion
- Joe Cocuzzo – drums
- Tony Corbiscello – drums
