= Solos and Duets =

Solos and Duets may refer to:

- Solos and Duets (Bucky Pizzarelli and John Pizzarelli album), 1996
- Solos and Duets (Eliane Elias album), 1994
