= Triple play (disambiguation) =

A triple play is a baseball play in which three outs are made as a result of continuous action without any intervening errors or pitches between outs.

Triple play may also refer to:

== Film and television ==
- Triple Play (optical discs), which provides the buyer with three formats of the movie or TV show they have purchased
- Triple Play, a 2004 American film starring Zac Efron
- Triple Play, a 1974 film by Ray Dennis Steckler
- Triple Play, a pricing game played for 3 cars on The Price Is Right
- Triple Play, a game show sketch on PBS' Square One Television

== Music ==
- Triple Play (Johnny Hodges album), 1967
- Triple Play (Lucky Peterson album), 1990
- Triple Play (Martin Pizzarelli album)

== Other uses ==
- Triple Play (video game series), a baseball video game series by EA Sports
- Triple play (telecommunications), the grouping of Internet access, TV and telephone service
- Triple Play (FIRST), a game for the 2005 FIRST Robotics competition
- Triple Play, a 1997 book by Elizabeth Gunn
- Triple play, a kind of multi-play video poker
- Triple play, a thin type of magnetic tape
- Triple play, a group of methods for distributing Mobile digital TV
