= Mam'selle =

"Mam'selle" is a bittersweet song about a rendez-vous with a "mam'selle" (mademoiselle) in a small café. The music was written by Edmund Goulding, the lyrics by Mack Gordon.

== Background ==
The song originally appeared in the movie, The Razor's Edge, with Tyrone Power in 1947, with French lyrics and in instrumental form.

== 1947 hits ==
Five versions of the song became top ten hits in 1947: by Art Lund, by Dick Haymes, by Frank Sinatra, by Dennis Day, and by The Pied Pipers. Frankie Laine had a hit jazz version, renowned for its vibe solo by Lou Singer.:

- The Art Lund recording was recorded on February 20, 1947 and released by MGM Records as catalog number 10011. The record first reached the Billboard magazine charts on April 11, 1947 and lasted 11 weeks on the chart, reaching No. 1.
- The Dick Haymes recording was recorded on March 6, 1947 and released by Decca Records as catalog number 23861. The record first reached the Billboard magazine charts on April 25, 1947 and lasted 8 weeks on the chart, peaking at No. 4.
- The Frank Sinatra recording was recorded on March 11, 1947 and released by Columbia Records as catalog number 37343. The record first reached the Billboard magazine charts on May 10, 1947 and lasted 4 weeks on the chart, peaking at No. 6 on the Best Seller chart, and #1 on the Jockey chart. In 1960 Sinatra rerecorded the song for the album Nice 'n' Easy.
- The Dennis Day recording was released by RCA Victor Records as catalog number 20-2211. The record first reached the Billboard magazine charts on April 25, 1947 and lasted 5 weeks on the chart, peaking at No. 8.
- The Pied Pipers recording was recorded on March 14, 1947 and released by Capitol Records as catalog number 396. The record first reached the Billboard magazine charts on May 2, 1947 and lasted 4 weeks on the chart, peaking at No. 9.
- The Frankie Laine recording was recorded on March 28, 1947 and released by Mercury Records as catalog number 5048. It reached no. 14 on the charts.

== Other Notable Recordings ==
- The R&B vocal group The Ravens released Mam'selle as the "A" side their 1952 OKeh single, catalog number 6888.
- Barbershop Harmony Society 2006 quartet champion Vocal Spectrum recorded Tom Sando's arrangement of the song on their first CD.
- The Four Freshmen - Four Freshmen And Five Trombones (1955)
- The Hi-Lo's - On Hand (1956)
- Johnny Hartman - And I Thought About You (1959)
- Ed Townsend - New In Town (1959)
- Andy Williams released a version on his 1960 album, Under Paris Skies.
- Dean Martin - French Style (1962)
- John Pizzarelli - John Pizzarelli Trio "After Hours" (1996)
- Dick Haymes - The Very Best Of Dick Haymes (1997)

== Popular culture ==
- In the 1953 film Pickup on South Street, Moe (played by Thelma Ritter) plays the song on her phonograph in her one-room apartment.
