= After Hours (John Pizzarelli album) =

Studio album by John Pizzarelli
- Released: January 16, 1996
- Genre: Swing; jazz standards; neo-bop
- Length: 46:16
- Label: Novus
- Producer: Ikuyoshi Hirakawa

John Pizzarelli chronology
New Standards (1994)	After Hours (1996)	Let's Share Christmas (1996)

Professional ratings
Review scores
Source	Rating
AllMusic	4.5/5 stars
The Penguin Guide to Jazz Recordings	3/4 stars

After Hours is a 1996 studio album for Novus Records by jazz guitarist John Pizzarelli and his trio. Most of the album consists of old standards, and features guests like Randy Sandke and Harry Allen.

== Track listing ==
1. "Coquette"
2. "Guess I'll Hang My Tears Out to Dry"
3. "I'll Never Be The Same"
4. "They Can't Take That Away from Me"
5. "You're Lookin' at Me"
6. "Mam'selle"
7. "But Not for Me"
8. "Lullaby"
9. "In the Wee Small Hours of the Morning"
10. "Sometimes I'm Happy"
11. "It Might as Well Be Spring"
12. "Be My Baby Tonight"
13. "Stringbean"

== Personnel ==
- John Pizzarelli – guitar
- Martin Pizzarelli – double-bass
- Ray Kennedy – piano
- Randy Sandke – guest, trumpet
- Harry Allen – guest, saxophone
