= P.S. Mr. Cole =

1999 tribute album by John Pizzarelli

Studio album by John Pizzarelli
- Released: September 14, 1999
- Recorded: January 1996
- Genre: Swing; vocal jazz
- Length: 66:23
- Label: RCA
- Producer: John Pizzarelli; Ikuyoshi Hirakawa

John Pizzarelli chronology
| Meets the Beatles (1998) | P.S. Mr. Cole (1999) | Kisses in the Rain (2000) |

Professional ratings
Review scores
| Source | Rating |
|---|---|
| AllMusic | 4.5/5 stars |

P.S. Mr. Cole is a tribute album by jazz guitarist and vocalist John Pizzarelli, along with his trio of brother Martin Pizzarelli on double-bass and Ray Kennedy on piano. The album contains covers of Nat King Cole songs as well as an original composition titled "That's Nat". It was Pizzarelli's second album of Nat King Cole covers, after the 1994 album Dear Mr. Cole.

== Track listing ==
1. Walkin' My Baby Back Home
2. Candy
3. Welcome To The Club
4. Indiana
5. I Love You For Sentimental Reasons
6. Don't Let it Go To Your Head
7. Meet Me At No Special Place
8. The Late Late Show
9. Smile
10. Tenderly
11. I Was A Little Too Lonely
12. I'm An Errand Boy For Rhythm
13. Then I'll Be Tired Of You
14. That's Nat
15. Azure-Te
16. I Know That You Know
17. Embraceable You
18. I Like Jersey Best

== Personnel ==
- John Pizzarelli – vocals, guitar
- Ray Kennedy – piano
- Martin Pizzarelli – double-bass
- Harry Allen – tenor saxophone on "Don't Let It Go To Your Head" and "Then I'll Be Tired of You"
