= Twogether =

Twogether may refer to:

- Twogether (film), 1992
- Twogether (Bucky Pizzarelli and John Pizzarelli album), 2001
- Twogether (John Hicks and Frank Morgan album), 2005–06
- Twogether (TV program), 2020
