= My Blue Heaven (album) =

Studio album by John Pizzarelli
- Released: April 18, 1990
- Recorded: February 6 – 7, 1990
- Studios: RCA Studio A, New York City
- Genres: Jazz, swing
- Length: 59:51
- Label: Chesky
- Producers: David Chesky; Norman Chesky

John Pizzarelli chronology
Sing! Sing! Sing! (1987)	My Blue Heaven (1990)	All of Me (1992)

My Blue Heaven is an album by jazz guitarist John Pizzarelli, released in 1990.

== Reception ==
Professional ratings
Review scores
Source	Rating
AllMusic	4/5 stars
DownBeat	3.5/5 stars
The Penguin Guide to Jazz Recordings	3/4 stars

DownBeat reviewer Bill Milkowski wrote, "Pizzarelli demonstrates his love for the swinging sounds of the early '40s Nat Cole Trio, comping percussively on a fat-body jazz guitar like Oscar Moore while laying down some smooth vocal work, a la Nat. He flaunts some Charlie Christian single-note chops on the jivey 'I'm an Errand Boy for Rhythm' and tosses off some cool scat-a-long unison lines on 'Lady Be Good' and Dave Frishberg's clever 'Can’t Take You Nowhere'". Milkowski singles out the guitar duet with Bucky Pizzarelli on 'Don’t Get Around Much Anymore', and the Dave Frishberg tribute to Zoot Sims, 'Zoot Walked In', as other highlights.

== Track listing ==
1. "My Blue Heaven" (Walter Donaldson, George A. Whiting) - (4:02)
2. "I'm an Errand Boy for Rhythm" (Nat King Cole) - (3:49)
3. "It Could Happen to You" (Johnny Burke, James Van Heusen) - (3:25)
4. "Oh, Lady Be Good!" (George Gershwin, Ira Gershwin) - (8:05)
5. "Touch of Your Lips" (Ray Noble) - (2:35)
6. "Can't Take You Nowhere" (Al Cohn, Dave Frishberg, Tiny Kahn) - (4:08)
7. "Take My Smile" (John Pizzarelli) - (2:55)
8. "That's What" (Nat King Cole) - (3:04)
9. "Stray Horn" (Bucky Pizzarelli) - (2:49)
10. "Best Man" (Ron Alfred, Fred Wise) - (2:48)
11. "Oh Me, Oh My, Oh Gosh" (Slam Stewart) - (3:27)
12. "Don't Get Around Much Anymore" (Duke Ellington, Bob Russell) - (3:13)
13. "Gee, Baby, Ain't I Good to You" (Andy Razaf, Don Redman) - (3:19)
14. "Passion Flower" (Milt Raskin, Billy Strayhorn) - (4:15)
15. "Zoot Walked In/Morning Fun" (Al Cohn, Dave Frishberg, Gerry Mulligan, Jack Sims, John Sims) - (4:29)
16. "Candy" (Mack David, Alex Kramer, Joan Whitney) - (3:38)

== Personnel ==
- John Pizzarelli – guitar, vocals
- Bucky Pizzarelli – guitar
- Clark Terry – trumpet
- Dave McKenna – piano
- Milt Hinton – double bass
- Connie Kay – drums
