= Keith Ingham =

English jazz pianist (1938–2026)

Keith Christopher R. Ingham (5 February 1938 – 12 March 2026) was an English jazz pianist, mainly active in swing and Dixieland revival.

== Early life and education ==
Ingham was born in London on 5 February 1938. His father played the organ in churches. Ingham was largely self-taught and started playing the piano at the age of ten. "He first played in nightclubs in 1960–62 while on government service in Hong Kong, monitoring Chinese airfields during the Cold War, and then read languages, specializing in classical Chinese, at Oxford University." He was married to the jazz singer Susannah McCorkle until their split in 1980.

== Later life and career ==
His first professional gigs occurred in 1964. He played with Sandy Brown, Bruce Turner, and Wally Fawkes over the next decade. He played with Bob Wilber and Bud Freeman in 1974, and moved to New York City in 1978. In the 1980s, he played with Benny Goodman, the World's Greatest Jazz Band, and Susannah McCorkle. He also worked with Maxine Sullivan, Marty Grosz, and Harry Allen. He recorded several albums of 1930s songs for Jump Records. He led several bands, including the New York Nine and the Hot Cosmopolites.

== Death ==
Ingham died on 1 February 2026, at the age of 87.

== Discography ==
Year recorded	Title	Label	Notes
1977	Keith Ingham Plays the Music of Jerome Kern	World Records-EMI	
1989	The Music of Victor Young	Jump	With Bob Reitmeier (piano), Frank Tate (bass), Vernell Fournier (drums)
1990	Out of the Past	Sackville	Solo piano
1990	Unsaturated Fats	Stomp Off	With Marty Grosz
1992	Donaldson Redux	Stomp Off	With Peter Ecklund (cornet), Dan Barrett (trombone), Bobby Gordon and Billy Novick (clarinet), Loren Schoenberg (tenor sax), Vince Giordano (bass sax, tuba, bass), Marty Grosz (guitar, banjo, vocals), Greg Cohen (bass), Hall Smith and Arnie Kinsella (drums)
1993	Music from the Mauve Decades	Sackville	With Bobby Gordon (clarinet), Hal Smith (drums)
1993	Love Held Lightly: Rare Songs by Harold Arlen	Angel Records	Peggy Lee and The Keith Ingham Octet. Recorded 1988, released in 1993, featuring 14 rare songs by Harold Arlen, 8 world-premiere recordings. Keith Ingham served as the album's musical director, pianist, arranger and co-producer. www.peggylee.com
1994	New York Nine: Volumes 1 & 2	Jump	With Randy Reinhart (cornet, trombone), Dan Barrett (trumpet, trombone), Phil Bodner (clarinet, alto sax), Scott Robinson (soprano sax, tenor sax, baritone sax), James Chirillo (guitar), Vince Giordano (bass sax, bass), Murray Wall (bass), Arnie Kinsella (drums)
1994	Are You Having Any Fun? -- A Celebration Of The Music Of Sammy Fain	Audiophile	With Harry Allen (tenor sax), John Pizzarelli (guitar), Dennis Irwin (bass), Oliver Jackson (drums)
1995	The Back Room Romp	Sackville	With Peter Ecklund (trumpet), Scott Robinson (clarinet, soprano sax, baritone sax), Harry Allen (tenor sax), James Chirillo (guitar), Murray Wall (bass), Jackie Williams (drums)
1995	Just Imagine...	Stomp Off	With Peter Ecklund (cornet), Dan Barrett (trombone), Dan Levinson (C-melody sax, clarinet), Scott Robinson (clarinet, tenor sax, baritone sax, bass sax), Marty Grosz (guitar, vocals), Greg Cohen (bass), Joe Hanchrow (tuba), Arnie Kinsella (drums)
1997	Going Hollywood	Stomp Off	With Peter Ecklund (cornet, trumpet), Joel Helleny (trombone), Vince Giordano (tuba), Scott Robinson (clarinet, soprano sax, alto sax, tenor sax, baritone sax, bass sax), Dan Block (clarinet, soprano sax), Andy Stein (violin), Marty Grosz (guitar, banjo, vocals), Brian Nalepka and Greg Cohen (bass), Arnie Kinsella (drums)
1998	A Mellow Bit of Rhythm	Sackville	
1998	A Stardust Melody	Sackville	With Randy Reinhart (trumpet), Bobby Gordon (clarinet), Scott Robinson (reeds), James Chirillo (guitar), Greg Cohen (bass), Arnie Kinsella (drums)
2000	We're in the Money	Sackville	With Peter Ecklund (trumpet), Bobby Gordon (clarinet), Chris Flory (guitar), Murray Wall (bass), Steve Little (drums)
2001	Keith Ingham New York 9, vol. 3	Jump	
2003	Great Songs from Great Britain	Jump	
2004	Music, Music Everywhere	Spotlite	Some tracks solo piano; most tracks trio, with Jim Richardson (bass), Bobby Worth (drums) Rockin' In Rhythm
2012	Rockin' In Rhythm	Arbors Records	
2015	All of Me		Aydenne Simone & The Keith Ingham Trio
