= Let's Share Christmas =

Studio album by John Pizzarelli
- Released: October 6, 1996
- Genre: Christmas music; Swing; Orchestral jazz
- Length: 43:06
- Label: RCA

John Pizzarelli chronology
After Hours (1996)	Let's Share Christmas (1996)	Our Love Is Here to Stay (1997)

Professional ratings
Review scores
Source	Rating
AllMusic	3/5 stars

External audio
- You may listen to "Christmas Time Is Here" here

Let's Share Christmas is a 1996 Christmas album by jazz guitarist John Pizzarelli, accompanied by his ordinary trio of Martin Pizzarelli and Ray Kennedy. Also accompanying the trio on a number of tracks are various guest musicians and orchestras.

== Track listing ==
1. "Let It Snow! Let It Snow! Let It Snow!"
2. "Let's Share Christmas"
3. "White Christmas"
4. "Have Yourself a Merry Little Christmas"
5. "What Are You Doing New Year's Eve?"
6. "Sleigh Ride"
7. "Christmas Time Is Here"
8. "I'll Be Home for Christmas"
9. "Santa Claus Is Near"
10. "The Christmas Song"
11. "Snowfall"
12. "Silent Night"

== Personnel ==
- John Pizzarelli – guitar
- Martin Pizzarelli – double-bass
- Ray Kennedy – piano
- Harry Allen – saxophone
- Jay Berliner – guitar
- Jeff Clayton – saxophone
- Andy Fusco – saxophone
- Bill Watrous – trombone
- Michel Legrand – conductor
- The Vanguard Jazz Orchestra
- Clayton/Hamilton Jazz Orchestra
