= King of Swing =

King of Swing or the Swing King may refer to:

- Count Basie (1904–1984), American jazz pianist, bandleader, organist, and composer
  - King of Swing, a 1956 album by Count Basie Orchestra
- King of Swing, a New Zealand bred and Australian based standardbred harness race horse
- The Swing Kings, a band
- Benny Goodman (1909–1986), American jazz clarinetist and bandleader
- Fletcher Henderson (1897–1952), American big band leader
- DK King of Swing, a video game
- the Ponza Swing King, a baseball pitching machine invented by Lorenzo Ponza
- the Swing King, a special cricket ball designed for swing bowling
- Teddy Stauffer, German swing musician
- Buddy Schwimmer, American swing dancer
- Bhuvneshwar Kumar, Indian swing bowler

The Sultan of Swing may refer to:

- Wasim Akram, Pakistani swing bowler
- Sultans of Swing, song by British band Dire Straits
- Sultans of Swing: The Very Best of Dire Straits, an album by British band Dire Straits
