= All of Me (John Pizzarelli album) =

Studio album by John Pizzarelli
- Released: 1992
- Genre: Jazz; swing
- Length: 47:27
- Label: Novus
- Producer: John Pizzarelli; Bucky Pizzarelli; William Derella; Ken Greengrass

John Pizzarelli chronology
My Blue Heaven (1990)	All of Me (1992)	Naturally (1993)

Professional ratings
Review scores
Source	Rating
AllMusic	3/5 stars
The Penguin Guide to Jazz Recordings	3/4 stars

All of Me is a studio album by American jazz singer and guitarist John Pizzarelli, backed by a string orchestra that includes his brother, Martin Pizzarelli. Also on the album is his father, guitarist Bucky Pizzarelli.

== Track listing ==
1. "Three Little Words" (Bert Kalmar, Harry Ruby) - (2:54)
2. "If I Had You" (James Campbell, Reginald Connelly, Ted Shapiro) - (4:20)
3. "The More I See You" (Harry Warren, Mack Gordon) - (4:42)
4. "'S Wonderful" (George Gershwin, Ira Gershwin) - (5:10)
5. "This Will Make You Laugh" (Irene Higginbotham) - (3:59)
6. "All of Me" (Gerald Marks, Seymour Simons) - (4:28)
7. "The River is Blue" (John Pizzarelli) - (4:05)
8. "I Know That You Know" (Anne Caldwell, Vincent Youmans) - (2:33)
9. "For All We Know" (J. Fred Coots, Sam M. Lewis) - (4:23)
10. "Love Falls into Place" (John Pizzarelli) - (4:20)
11. "My Baby Just Cares for Me" (Gus Kahn, Walter Donaldson) - (3:36)
12. "Roslyn" (John Pizzarelli) - (2:57)

== Personnel ==
- John Pizzarelli – guitar, vocals
- Anthony Kadleck – trumpet
- Anthony Ponella – trumpet
- Randy Sandke – trumpet
- Rocky Ciccarone – trombone
- Michael Davis – trombone
- Paul Faulise – trombone
- Jim Pugh – trombone
- Scott Robinson – flute, soprano and tenor saxophones
- Phil Bodner – flute, alto saxophone
- Sol Schlinger – flute, baritone saxophone
- Lawrence Feldman – flute
- John Frosk – flute
- William Kerr – flute
- Walt Levinsky – alto saxophone
- Frank Griffith – tenor saxophone
- Ken Levinsky – piano
- Bucky Pizzarelli – guitar, vocals, liner notes
- Martin Pizzarelli – double bass
- Joe Cocuzzo – drums
- Tony Corbiscello – drums
- Gordon Gottlieb – percussion, vibraphone

Strings

- Alan Martin, Louann Montesi, John Pintavalle, Alvin Rogers, Marilyn Wright, Anthony Posk, Ariana Bronne, Ruth Buffington, Peter Dimitriades, Max Ellen, Gerald Tarack, Charles Libove – violin
- Anne Callahan, Avron Coleman, Janet Nepkie, Seymour Barab – cello
