= Generations (Bucky Pizzarelli and John Pizzarelli album) =

Studio album by Bucky Pizzarelli & John Pizzarelli
- Released: April 10, 2007
- Recorded: May 17, 2006
- Genre: Swing
- Length: 62:19
- Label: Arbors Records

Bucky Pizzarelli chronology
Five for Freddie (2007)	Generations (2007)

John Pizzarelli chronology
Dear Mr. Sinatra (2006)	Generations (2007)	With a Song in My Heart (2008)

Professional ratings
Review scores
Source	Rating
The Penguin Guide to Jazz Recordings	3/4 stars

Generations is a jazz album by Bucky Pizzarelli and his son John Pizzarelli, released April 10, 2007. The album features performances by the father and son, a musical pairing of two guitarists who have worked with one another in studio and live events often before.

== Track listing ==
1. "Fred" – 3:49
2. "Polka Dots and Moonbeams" – 5:32
3. "Rose Room" – 3:58
4. "Midnight Sun" – 5:23
5. "A Sleepin' Bee" – 3:41
6. "At Sundown" – 3:44
7. "I'll Remember April" – 4:24
8. "The Second Movement of Sonatina" – 2:44
9. "Darn That Dream" – 3:34
10. "Avalon" – 3:42
11. "Early Autumn" – 6:00
12. "Graham Avenue Stroll" – 4:48
13. "How Long Has This Been Going On" – 4:33
14. "The Way You Look Tonight" – 4:59
15. "Variation and Fugue no.9 on 'La Folia'" – 1:28

== Personnel ==
- Bucky Pizzarelli – guitar, leader
- John Pizzarelli – guitar
