= Solos and Duets (Bucky Pizzarelli and John Pizzarelli album) =

1996 compilation album by Bucky Pizzarelli

Compilation album by Bucky Pizzarelli and John Pizzarelli
- Released: July 23, 1996
- Genre: Swing
- Length: 141:25
- Label: Jazz Classics

Bucky Pizzarelli chronology
Live at the Vineyard Theatre (1996)	Solos and Duets (1996)	Contrasts (1999)

Professional ratings
Review scores
Source	Rating
AllMusic	3/5 stars

Solos and Duets is a two disc compilation album of previously released recordings from Stash Records by the father and son pair Bucky Pizzarelli and John Pizzarelli. The entire release was riddled with mistakes, such as how disc one is actually disc two and vice versa.

== Track listing ==
=== Disc one ===
1. "You Must Believe in Spring"
2. "The Folks Who Live on the Hill"
3. "The Bad & The Beautiful"
4. "Last Night When We Were Young"
5. Medley: "Sophisticated Lady"/"Prelude to a Kiss"
6. "Smoke Gets In Your Eyes"
7. "One Morning In May"
8. Medley: "Autumn Leaves/"Autumn In New York"
9. "Flashes"
10. "Spring Can Really Hang You Up the Most"
11. "Concerto for Guitar"
12. "I Guess l'll Have To Change My Plan"
13. "Out of This World"
14. "The End of a Love Affair"
15. "Ill Wind"
16. "Bewitched, Bothered and Bewildered"
17. "'Round Midnight"
18. "Solo Flight"
19. "Blah! Blah! Blah!"
20. "Candlelights"
21. "All This and Heaven Too"
22. Medley: "My Wonderful One"/"My Best Girl"

=== Disc two ===
1. "Love for Sale"
2. "Pretty Women"
3. "Nuages"
4. "Sutton Mutton"
5. "Close Enough for Love"
6. "Undecided"
7. "Spain"
8. "All Through the Night"
9. "This Nearly Was Mine"
10. "Come Rain or Come Shine"
11. "Nikki"
12. "Stems"
13. "In a Mellow Tone"
14. "Soon"
15. "Why Did I Choose You?"
16. "Romanza & In The Dark"
17. "There Is No Greater Love"
18. "In a Mist"
19. "Four Brothers"
20. "Lush Life"
21. "Sleeping Bee"
22. "Blame It on My Youth"
23. "Goodbye"

== Personnel ==
- Bucky Pizzarelli – guitar
- John Pizzarelli – guitar
