= With a Song in My Heart (John Pizzarelli album) =

Studio album by John Pizzarelli
- Released: August 19, 2008
- Genre: Jazz
- Length: 43:17
- Label: Telarc Records
- Producer: John Pizzarelli; Robert Friedrich

John Pizzarelli chronology
Generations (2007)	With a Song in My Heart (2008)	Rockin' in Rhythm: A Tribute to Duke Ellington (2010)

Professional ratings
Review scores
Source	Rating
AllMusic	3.5/5 stars

With a Song in My Heart is a 2008 album by jazz singer and swing jazz guitarist John Pizzarelli, celebrating the music of Richard Rodgers.

== Track listing ==
1. "With a Song in My Heart" – 3:49
2. "This Can't Be Love" – 2:27
3. "I Like to Recognize the Tune" – 4:36
4. "It's Easy To Remember" – 4:13
5. "Johnny One Note" – 2:59
6. "Nobody's Heart" – 4:12
7. "Happy Talk" – 4:25
8. "Mountain Greenery" – 2:47
9. "I Have Dreamed" – 3:40
10. "The Lady Is a Tramp" – 2:34
11. "She Was Too Good to Me" – 4:36
12. "You've Got to Be Carefully Taught" – 2:59

All music composed by Richard Rodgers, with all lyrics by Lorenz Hart, except "Happy Talk", "I Have Dreamed" and "You've Got to Be Carefully Taught", lyrics by Oscar Hammerstein II.

== Personnel ==
- John Pizzarelli – guitar, vocals
- Larry Fuller – piano
- Martin Pizzarelli – bass
- Tony Tedesco – drums
- John Mosca – trombone, baritone horn
- Andy Fusco – alto saxophone, tenor saxophone, bass clarinet
- Kenny Berger – baritone saxophone, bass clarinet
- Tony Kadlech – trumpet, flugelhorn

=== Special guests ===
- Bucky Pizzarelli – guitar (track 4)
- Cesar Camargo Mariano – piano (track 7)
- Don Sebesky – Swing Seven Arrangements
