= Triple Play (Martin Pizzarelli album) =

Studio album by Martin Pizzarelli
- Released: May 24, 2004
- Genre: Jazz, swing
- Label: Victoria

Triple Play is the debut album by jazz double-bassist Martin Pizzarelli, who can often be found performing in trios led by his brother, John Pizzarelli. This album features Martin Pizzarelli with his father, Bucky Pizzarelli, on guitar and with Ray Kennedy, pianist from John Pizzarelli's trio.

== Track listing ==
1. Bye Bye Blackbird
2. Tour’s End
3. As Long As I Live
4. Polka Dots and Moonbeams
5. Triple Play
6. Moonglow
7. Sister Sadi
8. Parkside
9. So That’s Czak
10. Gee Baby
11. Ain’t I Good to You
12. Undecided
13. Strayhorn

== Personnel ==
- Martin Pizzarelli - double-bass
- Bucky Pizzarelli - guitar
- Ray Kennedy - piano
