= Sinatra & Jobim @ 50 =

Studio album by John Pizzarelli, featuring Daniel Jobim
- Released: July 28, 2017
- Recorded: January 2017
- Studio: Jacob Burns Media Arts Lab, Sito Poco Fundo, Rio de Janeiro
- Genre: Brazilian jazz; latin jazz
- Length: 51:21
- Label: Concord Jazz
- Producer: John Pizzarelli; Jessica Molaskey

John Pizzarelli chronology
Midnight McCartney (2015)	Sinatra & Jobim @ 50 (2017)

Sinatra & Jobim @ 50 is a latin jazz album by John Pizzarelli, released in 2017 with Concord Jazz. It's a tribute to the 1967 album Francis Albert Sinatra & Antônio Carlos Jobim, released fifty years ago at the time of recording. It's also Pizzarelli's first foray into the genre since his 2004 album Bossa Nova.

The album features Jobim's grandson Daniel Jobim on piano and vocals, whose parts were recorded in his native Brazil. Other backing vocals are provided by his wife Jessica Molaskey, and daughter Madeleine Pizzarelli.

The tracks include Antonio's Song, a tribute to Jobim by Michael Franks whom Pizzarelli also cited as a hero of his. Also included are two new tracks written by Pizzarelli and Molaskey.

== Reception ==
Professional ratings
Review scores
Source	Rating
AllMusic	4.5/5 stars
The Times	3/5 stars

Matt Collar of AllMusic rated it with the best of John Pizzarelli's albums to date, with 4.5 stars. He commented "Sinatra & Jobim at 50 works as both an homage to two of Pizzarelli's biggest influences and a revealing showcase for his ever deepening musical palette," and that "the album was an unexpected delight for fans."

C. Michael Bailey summarised the album for All About Jazz as a "quiet, breezy affair of lilting Brazilian rhythms and melodies played by a crack team of musicians." He commented "singing and guitar playing are of the level we have come to expect of Pizzarelli, who has matured fully into this role of keeper of the flame for this flavor of jazz music."

Will Friedwald of The Wall Street Journal ended his review saying the album "succeed[ed] at maintaining a tricky balance: staying true to the [original] while, at the same time, creating something new and exciting out of music already considered classic.

Christopher Louden wrote for the JazzTimes that "Pizzarelli revisits the Sinatra-Jobim oeuvre with sublimely honorific results."

== Track listing ==
No.	Title	Writer(s)	Length
1.	"Baubles, Bangles and Beads"	George Forrest; Robert Wright	3:09
2.	"Água de Beber"	Norman Gimbel; Antônio Carlos Jobim; Vinícius de Moraes	4:07
3.	"Meditation/Quiet Nights of Quiet Stars"	Gimbel; Jobim; Gene Lees; Newton Mendonça	3:59
4.	"Dindi"	Ray Gilbert; Jobim; Aloysio de Oliveira	3:53
5.	"I Concentrate on You/Wave"	Jobim; Cole Porter	5:32
6.	"Antonio's Song"	Michael Franks	5:04
7.	"Two Kites"	Jobim	4:33
8.	"She's So Sensitive"	Jessica Molaskey; John Pizzarelli	4:19
9.	"Bonita"	Gilbert; Jobim	4:52
10.	"If You Never Come to Me/Change Partners"	Irving Berlin; Gilbert; Jobim; de Oliveira	5:50
11.	"Canto Casual"	Molaskey; Pizzarelli	6:03

== Personnel ==
=== Performers ===
- John Pizzarelli – guitar (acoustic), guitar (electric), primary artist, vocals, vocals (background)
- Daniel Jobim – piano, vocals
- Harry Allen – sax (tenor)
- Hélio Alves – piano
- Duduka da Fonseca – drums, percussion
- Mike Karn – double bass
- Jessica Molaskey – vocals (background)
- Madeleine Pizzarelli – vocals (background)

=== Support ===
- John Pizzarelli – arranger, producer
- Daniel Jobim – arranger, engineer
- Jessica Molaskey – composer, producer
- Irving Berlin – composer
- Vinícius de Moraes – composer
- Aloysio de Oliveira – composer
- George Forrest – composer
- Michael Franks – composer
- Ray Gilbert – composer
- Norman Gimbel – composer
- Antônio Carlos Jobim – composer
- Newton Mendonça – composer
- Manuel Mindlin Lafer – composer
- Gene Lees – composer
- Cole Porter – composer
- Robert Wright – composer
- Jacob Blickenstaff – photography
- Joseph McCarthy – package design
- Bill Moss – engineer, mastering, mixing

== Notes ==
- Songs are listed in the language as they appear in the album's liner notes, but link to their Portuguese titles on Wikipedia where appropriate.
- Some reviewers reference the album with the word "at" (see References) but the album cover and official sites use an ampersand.
