= Monday Off =

Vocal jazz group based in New York City

Monday Off is a vocal jazz group based in New York City. The quartet is composed of Amy Cervini, Hilary Gardner, Richard Roland and Raymond Sage.

The group formed in Denver, Colorado in March 1999 when all four members were appearing in a production of the musical Titanic. The name Monday Off comes from the day when theaters are closed. They performed at Carnegie Hall with Skitch Henderson and The New York Pops.

Their debut album, Christmas Time Is Here (Victoria, 2001), was recorded with jazz guitarist Bucky Pizzarelli. Their second album, Monday Off, included guest guitarist Gene Bertoncini, clarinetist Anat Cohen, and trumpeter Avishai Cohen.
