= Live at Birdland (John Pizzarelli album) =

Live album by John Pizzarelli
- Released: April 22, 2003
- Recorded: September 25–25, 2002
- Genre: Swing; Jazz; Vocal jazz

John Pizzarelli chronology
The Rare Delight of You (2002)	Live at Birdland (2003)	Bossa Nova (2004)

Professional ratings
Review scores
Source	Rating
AllMusic	4/5 stars
The Penguin Guide to Jazz Recordings	3/4 stars

Live at Birdland is a 2003 live two-disc jazz album by guitarist John Pizzarelli and his trio. The song choices are mostly ballads and jazz standards, performed in the swing medium, mixed up here and there with a few original compositions. Pizzarelli consistently garners favorable reviews from critics at Allmusic, generally receiving 4 stars or more for his albums.

== Track listing ==
Disc One

1. "Introduction"
2. "Just You, Just Me"
3. "The Frim Fram Sauce"
4. "This Song Is You"
5. "Isn't It a Pity?"
6. "Rhode Island Intro"
7. "Rhode Island"
8. "Ray Kennedy Library of Congress Story"
9. "Gospel Truth"
10. "Ray Kennedy Dizzy Gillespie Story"
11. "Tea for Tatum"
12. "James Taylor Intro 1"
13. "Don't Let Me Be Lonely Tonight"
14. "James Taylor Intro 2"
15. "Mean Old Man"
16. "Manhattan"
17. "Rosemary Clooney Story"
18. "Moonlight Becomes You"
19. "Final Intro"
20. "Will You Still Be Mine?"

Disc Two

1. "Introduction"
2. "Three Little Words"
3. "They Can't Take That Away from Me"
4. "Oh, How My Heart Beats for You"
5. "The Day I Found You"
6. "Polliwog Story"
7. "It's Only a Paper Moon"
8. "Stompin' at the Savoy"
9. "Better Run Before It's Spring"
10. "Grover Kemble Story"
11. "Headed Out to Vera's"
12. "Medley: Gee Baby, Ain't I Good to You/Baby, Baby All the Time/Midnight Blue"
13. "I Like Jersey Best Intro"
14. "I Like Jersey Best"
15. "My Castle's Rockin'"
16. "Baby Just Come Home to Me"

== Personnel ==
- John Pizzarelli – vocals, guitar
- Ray Kennedy – piano
- Martin Pizzarelli – double-bass
- Grover Kemble – vocals
