= Our Love Is Here to Stay (album) =

Our Love is Here to Stay

Studio album by John Pizzarelli
- Released: April 29, 1997
- Recorded: February 1997
- Genre: Swing; neo-bop; jazz standards; big band
- Length: 45:51
- Label: RCA

John Pizzarelli chronology
Let's Share Christmas (1996)	Our Love is Here to Stay (1997)	Meets the Beatles (1998)

Professional ratings
Review scores
Source	Rating
AllMusic	4/5 stars
The Penguin Guide to Jazz Recordings	3/4 stars

Our Love is Here to Stay is a 1997 studio album by jazz guitarist and singer John Pizzarelli. Pizzarelli is joined by his regular trio members consisting of brother Martin Pizzarelli on double-bass and Ray Kennedy, as well as trombonist Don Sebesky and his big band.

The title track received a 1998 Grammy nomination for best arrangement.

== Track listing ==
1. Dream
2. Our Love Is Here to Stay
3. Avalon
4. Honey Pie
5. The Day I Found You ('The Pollywog Song')
6. Kalamazoo (I've Got A Gal In)
7. Have Another One, Not Me
8. Little Girl
9. Nina Never Knew
10. Rhythm Is Our Business
11. It's Sunday
12. Say Hey Kid

== Personnel ==
- John Pizzarelli – vocals, guitar
- Martin Pizzarelli – double-bass
- Ray Kennedy – piano
- The Don Sebesky New York All Star Band
