= The Rare Delight of You =

Studio album by John Pizzarelli with the George Shearing Quintet
- Released: April 23, 2002
- Recorded: October 16–18, 2001
- Genre: Swing; Jazz

John Pizzarelli with the George Shearing Quintet chronology
Twogether (2001)	The Rare Delight of You (2002)	Live at Birdland (2003)

Professional ratings
Review scores
Source	Rating
AllMusic	4.5/5 stars
The Penguin Guide to Jazz Recordings	3.5/4 stars

The Rare Delight of You is a 2002 album by jazz guitarist John Pizzarelli accompanied by pianist George Shearing and his quintet. Interspersed throughout are some established jazz standards as well as a few traditional pop ballads.

== Track listing ==
1. "If Dreams Come True"
2. "The Lady's In Love with You"
3. "Everything Happens to Me"
4. "Lulu's Back In Town"
5. "Something to Remember You By"
6. "Lemon Twist"
7. "Lost April"
8. "Problem"
9. "The Rare Delight of You"
10. "Shine On Your Shoes"
11. "Indian Summer"
12. "Be Careful It's My Heart"
13. "September In the Rain"
14. "I Predict"
15. "Lucky to Be Me"

== Personnel ==
- John Pizzarelli – vocals, guitar
- George Shearing – piano
- Ted Piltzecker – vibraphone
- Reg Schwager – guitar
- Neil Swainson – double-bass
- Dennis Mackrel – drums
