= Hot Club of 52nd Street =

Live album by Bucky Pizzarelli & Howard Alden
- Released: May 25, 2004
- Recorded: June 19, 2003
- Genre: Jazz
- Length: 49:59
- Label: Chesky Records

Hot Club of 52nd Street is a live jazz quartet album co-led by guitarists Bucky Pizzarelli and Howard Alden in tribute to Django Reinhardt, released on May 25, 2004.

It derives its name from Manhattan's 52nd Street which is sometimes referred to as "Swing Street" because of the jazz clubs located along the west side.

== Track listing ==
1. Rosetta – 4:42
2. On the Sunny Side of the Street – 6:23
3. Tangerine – 5:39
4. Nuages – 6:42
5. Strike Up the Band – 5:15
6. Some of These Days – 4:07
7. Avalon – 5:02
8. Melancholy Baby – 6:10
9. I've Got Rhythm – 5:59

== Personnel ==
- Bucky Pizzarelli – Guitar, co-leader
- Howard Alden – Guitar, co-leader
- Johnny Frigo – Violin
- Michael Moore – Bass

== Reception ==
Professional ratings
Review scores
| Source | Rating |
|---|---|
| Allmusic | 4/5 stars |

Ken Dryden of Allmusic had praise for Hot Club of 52nd Street but felt the crowd's applause overtook the live music and made it hard to hear.
