= Bossa Nova (John Pizzarelli album) =

Studio album by John Pizzarelli
- Released: April 27, 2004
- Recorded: May 5–9, 2003
- Genre: Bossa nova; Brazilian jazz
- Length: 53:48
- Label: Telarc

John Pizzarelli chronology
Live at Birdland (2003)	Bossa Nova (2004)	Knowing You (2005)

Professional ratings
Review scores
Source	Rating
AllMusic	4/5 stars
The Penguin Guide to Jazz Recordings	3.5/4 stars

Bossa Nova is a 2004 Brazilian jazz album by jazz guitarist John Pizzarelli, who is typically known for his swing guitar skills. Some of the selections are penned by Tom Jobim, including "The Girl from Ipanema".

== Critical reception ==
AllMusic reviewer Ken Dryden praised the album for "Pizzarelli's soft, swinging vocals and strong but understated guitar," noting "Gershwin's 'Fascinatin' Rhythm' is easily adapted into a bossa nova."

== Track listing ==
1. "One Note Samba" (Jobim) – 4:42
2. "Fascinatin' Rhythm" (Gershwin, Gershwin) – 3:53
3. "The Girl from Ipanema" (DeMoraes, Gimbel, Jobim) – 4:55
4. "Your Smiling Face" (Taylor) – 2:57
5. "Estate" (Brighetti, Martino) – 4:58
6. "Desafinado" (Jobim, Lees, Mendonca) – 2:35
7. "Aquelas Coisas Todas" (All Those Things) (Horta) – 5:28
8. "I Remember" (Sondheim) – 3:45
9. "Francesca" (Pizzarelli) – 4:32
10. "Love Dance" (Lins, Williams) – 3:39
11. "Só Danço Samba" (DeMoraes, Jobim) – 3:29
12. "Aguas De Marco" (Waters of March)" (Jobim) – 3:59
13. "Soares Samba" (Pizzarelli) – 4:56

== Personnel ==
- John Pizzarelli – vocals, guitar
- Ray Kennedy – piano
- Martin Pizzarelli – double-bass
- Harry Allen – tenor saxophone
- Paulo Braga – drums
- Jim Saporito – percussion
- Pamela Sklar – flute
