= Italian Intermezzo =

Studio album by Bucky Pizzarelli and Ken Peplowski Sextet
- Released: 2000
- Genres: Opera; Italian folk; swing
- Length: 43:53
- Labels: Menus and Music
- Producer: Sharon O'Connor

Bucky Pizzarelli and Ken Peplowski Sextet chronology
April Kisses (1999)	Italian Intermezzo (2000)	Sonatina (2001)

Italian Intermezzo is an album by jazz guitarist Bucky Pizzarelli and the Ken Peplowski Sextet. The songs come from Italian folk music and the opera. The album was released in 2000 as a companion to a cookbook and was intended for playing during an authentic Italian meal.

== Track listing ==
1. "Ah! Marie"
2. "Non Dimenticar"
3. "Ciribiribin"
4. "Arrivederci Roma"
5. "Core 'Ngrato"
6. "Anema E Core"
7. "Funiculi, Funicula"
8. "Mattinata"
9. "Torna A Surriento"
10. "Malafemena"
11. "Vieni Sul Mar"
12. "O Sole Mio"
13. "Santa Lucia"
14. "Tarantella"

== Personnel ==
- Bucky Pizzarelli – guitar
- Ken Peplowski – clarinet
- Frederico Britos Ruiz – violin
- Lou Pallo – guitar
- Greg Cohen – double-bass
- Charlie Giordano – accordion
