= Just Friends (Rick Haydon and John Pizzarelli album) =

Studio album by Rick Haydon and John Pizzarelli
- Released: February 21, 2006
- Recorded: January 11–12, 2005
- Genre: Jazz; vocal jazz
- Label: Mel Bay Records

John Pizzarelli chronology
Knowing You (2005)	Just Friends (2006)	Dear Mr. Sinatra (2006)

Just Friends is a vocal jazz album by Rick Haydon and John Pizzarelli, released in February 2006 with Mel Bay Records.

It reached 19 on the JazzWeek Top 100 charts in April 2006.

== Reception ==
Professional ratings
Review scores
Source	Rating
AllMusic	4/5 stars

Mike Shanley for the JazzTimes wrote that technically "both guitarists play Bill Moll seven-string axes, so it would’ve been nice if this album did a better job of distinguishing one from the other" but that "their musical touchstones and graceful styles blend together like a seasoned team."

Ken Dryden at All About Jazz had a more positive take, writing the duo alternates "between lead and rhythm lines so effectively that it's hard to tell who is who." He concluded "it is obvious that they had a ball making this disc."

Scott Yanow rated the album four stars on AllMusic, commenting that Haydon "holds his own with Pizzarelli on this good-natured and consistently swinging quartet set."

== Track listing ==
No.	Title	Length
1.	"Chasin' The Blues"	3:26
2.	"Two Funky People"	5:33
3.	"Sometime Ago"	5:05
4.	"Halley's Comet"	5:04
5.	"Look For The Silver Lining"	2:05
6.	"Samba De Orfeu"	6:00
7.	"It's A Wonderful World"	5:05
8.	"Old Folks"	3:27
9.	"Perdido"	5:48
10.	"Tony's Tune"	3:49
11.	"Just Friends"	7:03

== Personnel ==
- Rick Haydon – 7-string electric guitar
- John Pizzarelli – 7-string electric guitar
- Martin Pizzarelli – bass
- Tony Tedesco – drums
