= Larry Fuller (pianist) =

American jazz pianist

- Born: July 14, 1965 (age 60); Toledo, Ohio, US
- Genres: Mainstream jazz
- Occupation: Musician
- Instrument: Piano
- Labels: Capri, Pony Boy
- Website: www.larryfuller.com

Larry Fuller (born July 14, 1965) is a jazz pianist based in New York City, performing in the style of mainstream jazz. Fuller is a Yamaha-endorsed Artist and leader of the Larry Fuller Trio. He was also the last pianist with legendary bassist Ray Brown's Trio, member of the Jeff Hamilton Trio, and member of the John Pizzarelli Quartet. He has also performed with artists including Stanley Turrentine, Phil Woods, Clark Terry, Herb Ellis, Ernestine Anderson, John Legend, and Nicholas Payton.

== Career ==
Larry Fuller was raised in Toledo, Ohio. He began his musical studies in jazz at the age of 11. Floyd "Candy" Johnson, a veteran of the Count Basie and Duke Ellington Orchestras, mentored Fuller by hiring him for regular paying gigs when he was 13 and 14 years old. In the early days of his career, Fuller frequently performed in the nearby cities of Detroit and Ann Arbor, Michigan.

In 1988, Fuller moved to Seattle to work with vocalist Ernestine Anderson. For six years, Fuller was Anderson's pianist and musical director – traveling and performing worldwide. He also recorded with Anderson, including on her Grammy-nominated CD, Now and Then, on Qwest Records.

In 1994, Fuller joined drummer Jeff Hamilton's trio. Fuller toured and recorded several CDs in the US and Europe with the Jeff Hamilton Trio, including It's Hamilton Time, Hands On, Jeff Hamilton Trio, Live!, and Live at Steamers.

In 1998, Fuller recorded an album by the Larry Fuller Trio on Pony Boy Records, Easy Walker, with Ray Brown on bass and Jeff Hamilton on drums. The album received the Northwest Album of the Year award in 2003, a Golden Ear Seattle Jazz Award.

In April 2000, Fuller joined the Ray Brown Trio. Fuller was the trio's last pianist, and performed with Brown until his death in the summer of 2002.

From 2005 until 2013, Fuller performed with guitarist John Pizzarelli. As part of the John Pizzarelli Quartet, Fuller toured throughout the United States, Europe, Japan and South America. Some of John Pizzarelli Quartet recordings with Fuller include Double Exposure and Rockin' in Rhythm.

Today, Fuller tours and records as the band leader of the Larry Fuller Trio. His latest album, “Overjoyed”, was released by Capri Records on May 17, 2019. “Overjoyed” follows Fuller’s critically acclaimed, self-titled trio album released in September 2014, also on Capri Records. Both albums topped the jazz radio chart for several consecutive months.

In 2021, Larry Fuller became a Yamaha-endorsed Artist.

On August 28, 2022, Fuller was awarded the glass Key to the City of Toledo, Ohio “For Excellence in Jazz Music and Headlining the Inaugural Glass City Jazz Festival”.

In addition to the musicians mentioned above, Larry Fuller has performed with Harry "Sweets" Edison, Stanley Turrentine, Phil Woods, Clark Terry, Herb Ellis, Marlena Shaw, Kevin Mahogany, John Clayton, John Heard, Bennie Golson, Bucky Pizzarelli, Emily Remler, Jimmy Witherspoon, Eddie Harris, Anita O'Day, Steve Allen, Houston Person, Regina Carter, Nicholas Payton, John Legend, and others.

== Discography ==
- Overjoyed (Capri, 2019)
