= April Kisses =

Studio album by Bucky Pizzarelli
- Released: September 14, 1999
- Recorded: March 3–10, 1999
- Genre: Swing
- Length: 51:31
- Label: Arbors

Bucky Pizzarelli chronology
Passion Guitars (1999)	April Kisses (1999)	Italian Intermezzo (2000)

Professional ratings
Review scores
Source	Rating
The Penguin Guide to Jazz Recordings	3/4 stars

April Kisses is a solo jazz guitar album by Bucky Pizzarelli that was released in 1999. Seven tracks were composed by Carl Kress. The title track was written by Eddie Lang.

== Track listing ==
1. "Helena"
2. "April Kisses"
3. "Afterthoughts, Part 1"
4. "Afterthoughts, Part 2"
5. "Afterthoughts, Part 3"
6. "The End of a Love Affair"
7. "Slow Burning"
8. "Tears"
9. "Love Song"
10. "It Must Be True"
11. "Indy Annie"
12. "Sutton Mutton"
13. "Come Sunday"
14. "Squattin' at the Grotto"
15. "Please"
16. "Smoke Gets in Your Eyes"
17. "Slamerino"
18. "Peg Leg Shuffle"
19. "Stompin' for Boz"
20. "Silk City Blues"

== Personnel ==
- Bucky Pizzarelli – guitar, solo
