= The Swing Kings =

Studio album by Bucky Pizzarelli
- Released: November 14, 2003
- Genre: Jazz
- Label: Victoria

The Swing Kings: A Tribute to Benny Goodman is a jazz tribute album led by Bucky Pizzarelli and Ray Kennedy, dedicated to Benny Goodman and released by Victoria Records in 2005.

== Track listing ==
1. Back Home Again in Indiana
2. Corner Pocket
3. Crying for the Carolines
4. 'Deed I Do
5. I Don't Know Why I Love You Like I Do
6. I Guess I'll Have To Change My Plan
7. Oh, Lady Be Good!
8. More Than You Know
9. Seven On Charlie
10. Some of These Days
11. Tangerine
12. They Can't Take That Away From Me

== Personnel ==
- Bucky Pizzarelli - guitar
- Ray Kennedy - piano
- Ken Peplowski - clarinet
- Martin Pizzarelli - double bass
- Chuck Redd - vibraphone
- Tony Tedesco - drums
