= Kisses in the Rain =

Studio album by John Pizzarelli
- Released: February 22, 2000
- Recorded: June 15 – July 17, 1999
- Genre: Swing; Jazz
- Label: Telarc Records

John Pizzarelli chronology
P.S. Mr. Cole (1999)	Kisses in the Rain (2000)	Two Family House (2000)

Professional ratings
Review scores
Source	Rating
Allmusic	4/5 stars
The Penguin Guide to Jazz Recordings	4/4 stars

Kisses in the Rain is John Pizzarelli's Telarc Records debut from 2000. The date includes his working trio, composed of Martin Pizzarelli on double-bass and Ray Kennedy on piano.

== Track listing ==
1. "From Monday On"
2. "When I Take My Sugar to Tea"
3. "I'm In the Mood for Love"
4. "I Can't Get Up the Nerve"
5. "I Got Rhythm"
6. "When Lights Are Low"
7. "I Thought About You"
8. "Should I?"
9. "Don't Be That Way"
10. "I Could Have Told You So"
11. "Kisses in the Rain"
12. "Oscar Night"
13. "Polka Dots and Moonbeams"
14. "Baby Just Come Home to Me"
15. "Lifetime or Two, A"
16. "I Wouldn't Trade You"

== Personnel ==
- John Pizzarelli – guitar, vocals
- Martin Pizzarelli – double-bass
- Ray Kennedy – piano
