= Around the World in 80 Years =

2006 jazz album by Bucky Pizzarelli

Studio album by Bucky Pizzarelli
- Released: 2006
- Genre: Swing
- Length: 53:13
- Label: Victoria Records
- Producer: Ray Kennedy

Around the World in 80 Years is a Jazz album by Bucky Pizzarelli, released in 2006. The album features performances by his sons and daughter, and is a musical retrospective of his career.

== Track listing ==
1. The Tonight Show Theme – 1:40
2. When the Moon Comes Over the Mountain – 2:14
3. Racing With the Moon – 3:44
4. Lullaby of Broadway – 4:26
5. Cry Me a River – 4:06
6. Minute Samba – 1:57
7. A Nightingale Sang in Berkley Square – 4:17
8. The End of a Love Affair – 1:54
9. Bucknees's Blues – 6:09
10. Nuages – 6:31
11. Body and Soul – 5:19
12. Twilight Time – 5:37
13. Seven Comes Eleven – 5:19

== Personnel ==
- Bucky Pizzarelli – guitar, leader
- John Pizzarelli – guitar
- Mary Pizzarelli – guitar
- Martin Pizzarelli – double bass
- Tony Tedesco – drums
- Ray Kennedy- piano, producer
