= Doug and Bucky =

Studio album by Bucky Pizzarelli & Doug Jernigan
- Released: June 27, 2006
- Genre: Jazz
- Label: Flying Fish Records

Bucky Pizzarelli & Doug Jernigan chronology
Same Title - Original Vinyl Release Flying Fish 043 (1978)	Doug and Bucky (2006)

Doug and Bucky is a jazz guitar duet album of standards by Bucky Pizzarelli and Doug Jernigan, released June 27, 2006.

It was rated 4.5 out of 5 stars by AllMusic.

== Track listing ==
1. Honeysuckle Rose - 2:30
2. Talk of the Town - 4:30
3. Slow Burning - 3:13
4. The Days of Wine and Roses - 3:00
5. Limehouse Blues - 2:11
6. All the Things You Are - 2:24
7. The End of a Love Affair - 1:57
8. Sweet Lorraine - 2:30
9. 'Round Midnight - 2:40
10. Moonlight in Vermont - 3:17

== Personnel ==
- Bucky Pizzarelli - guitar
- Doug Jernigan - pedal steel guitar
