= Tony DeSare =

American singer, pianist and songwriter

- Born: 1976 (age 49–50); Glens Falls, New York, U.S.
- Genres: Jazz, soul
- Occupations: Musician, singer-songwriter
- Instruments: Piano, vocals
- Labels: Telarc, AJD
- Website: www.tonydesare.com

Tony DeSare (born 1976) is an American jazz and soul singer, pianist and songwriter.

== Early life ==
DeSare was born in Glens Falls, New York in 1976. He began playing the piano as a young child, and had public performances in his late teens. He kept performing locally during his studies at Ithaca College.

== Later life and career ==
DeSare moved to New York City in 1998 and played at the Marquis Hotel, then performed in an off-Broadway musical Our Sinatra. He met jazz guitarist Bucky Pizzarelli, who helped develop his career.

DeSare's debut album, Want You, was released by Telarc in 2005. The material included jazz standards, covers of lesser-known pieces, and original songs. It peaked at No. 43 on the Billboard jazz albums chart.

DeSare's 2007 release Last First Kiss also included originals and standards, from Prince's "Kiss" and Carole King's "I Feel the Earth Move" to "Gee Baby Ain't I Good to You" and "How Deep Is the Ocean?" It was featured on NPR's Weekend Edition Saturday and reached No. 8 on the Billboard jazz albums chart.

Telarc released Radio Show, which included standards and DeSare's originals, around 2009. A Christmas album, Christmas Home, was released by AJD around 2016.

== Discography ==
- Want You (Telarc, 2005)
- Last First Kiss (Telarc, 2007)
- Radio Show (Telarc, 2009)
- PiANO (AJD, 2013)
- Christmas Home (AJD, 2015)
- Lush Life (with Tedd Firth) (AJD, 2019)
- Tony Desare (Southpaw Records, 2026)
