= Passion Guitars =

Studio album by Bucky Pizzarelli and John Pizzarelli
- Released: May 4, 1999
- Recorded: January 15, 1997
- Genre: Swing; Latin jazz
- Length: 62:30
- Label: Groove Jams

Bucky Pizzarelli and John Pizzarelli chronology
Contrasts (1999)	Passion Guitars (1999)	April Kisses (1999)

Alternative cover
- 2001 re-issue

Professional ratings
Review scores
Source	Rating
AllMusic	4/5 stars
AllMusic	(reissue)

Passion Guitars is a studio album by Bucky Pizzarelli and John Pizzarelli containing swing and Latin jazz standards. The album was later released as Passionate Guitars by LRC Records in an attempt to shed this version's poor marketing, which confused potential buyers into thinking this was somehow a smooth jazz album.

== Track listing ==
1. "Besame Mucho"
2. "Triste"
3. "One Note Samba"
4. "The Girl from Ipanema"
5. "Line for Lyons"
6. "I Found a New Baby"
7. "Orchids in the Moonlight"
8. "Maybe This Summer"
9. "'S Wonderful"
10. "A Day in the Life of a Fool"
11. "Meditation"

== Personnel ==
- Bucky Pizzarelli – guitar
- John Pizzarelli – guitar
- Gene Bertoncini – guitar
- Ray Kennedy – piano
- Butch Miles – drums
- Martin Pizzarelli – double bass
