= Nirvana (Bucky Pizzarelli album) =

Studio album by Bucky Pizzarelli
- Released: August 1, 1995
- Recorded: February 21, 1995
- Length: 62:24
- Label: LaserLight

Bucky Pizzarelli chronology
Guitar Quintet (1988)	Nirvana (1995)	Live at the Vineyard Theatre (1996)

Professional ratings
Review scores
Source	Rating
AllMusic	4/5 stars

Nirvana is a Bucky Pizzarelli studio album of jazz standards. Also on the album is his son, the jazz guitarist John Pizzarelli.

== Track listing ==
1. Azurte
2. Sing, Sing, Sing
3. A Little World Called Home
4. Pick Yourself Up
5. Nuages
6. Honeysuckle Rose
7. Willow Weep for Me
8. Tangerine
9. It's Been a Long Time/Don't Take Your Love from Me
10. Two Funky People
11. Come Rain or Come Shine
12. Stompin' at the Savoy

== Personnel ==
- Bucky Pizzarelli – guitar
- John Pizzarelli – guitar
- Lynn Seaton – double-bass
- Bernard Purdie – drums
