= Dear Mr. Sinatra =

Studio album by John Pizzarelli and the Clayton/Hamilton Jazz Orchestra
- Released: July 18, 2006
- Recorded: June 29–30, 2005
- Genre: Vocal jazz; Swing
- Label: Telarc Records

John Pizzarelli chronology
Just Friends (2006)	Dear Mr. Sinatra (2006)	With a Song in My Heart (2008)

Professional ratings
Review scores
Source	Rating
Allmusic	4.5/5 stars
The Penguin Guide to Jazz Recordings	3/4 stars

Dear Mr. Sinatra is a 2006 album by jazz singer and swing jazz guitarist John Pizzarelli. Pizzarelli is backed by the Clayton/Hamilton Jazz Orchestra, led by Jeff Hamilton and John Clayton.

== Track listing ==
1. "Ring-A-Ding Ding" (Sammy Cahn, Jimmy Van Heusen) – 3:37
2. "You Make Me Feel So Young" (Mack Gordon, Josef Myrow) – 4:00
3. "How About You?" (Ralph Freed, Burton Lane) – 2:43
4. "If I Had You" (Jimmy Campbell, Reginald Connelly, Ted Shapiro) – 4:50
5. "Witchcraft" (Cy Coleman, Carolyn Leigh) – 4:14
6. "I've Got You Under My Skin" (Cole Porter) – 3:26
7. "Nice 'N' Easy" (Alan Bergman, Marilyn Bergman, Lewis Spence) – 2:47
8. Medley: "I See Your Face Before Me"/"In the Wee Small Hours of the Morning" (Howard Dietz, Arthur Schwartz)/(Bob Hilliard, David Mann) – 4:16
9. "Can't We Be Friends?" (Paul James, Kay Swift) – 3:57
10. "Yes Sir, That's My Baby" (Walter Donaldson, Gus Kahn) – 3:04
11. "Last Dance" (Cahn, Van Heusen) – 2:23

== Personnel ==
- John Pizzarelli – vocals, guitar
- Jeff Hamilton – drums
- John Clayton – arrangement, double-bass
- Clayton/Hamilton Jazz Orchestra
- Don Sebesky, Dick Lieb and Quincy Jones – arrangements
