= Twogether (Bucky Pizzarelli and John Pizzarelli album) =

Studio album by Bucky Pizzarelli and John Pizzarelli
- Released: 2001
- Recorded: June 8, 2001
- Genre: Swing; jazz standards
- Label: Victrola

John Pizzarelli chronology
Let There Be Love (2000)	Twogether (2001)	The Rare Delight of You (2002)

Professional ratings
Review scores
Source	Rating
AllMusic	4.5/5 stars

Twogether is a 2001 studio album by Bucky Pizzarelli and John Pizzarelli of jazz standards, a particular specialty of the pair. The Victrola Records label is small and independent.

== Track listing ==
1. Bing's Blues
2. Dinah
3. Honeysuckle Rose
4. I'm Through With Love/I'll Never Be the Same
5. If I Had You
6. Indiana
7. It Must Be True/Please
8. It's Been a Long, Long Time/Don't Take Your Love from Me
9. Just One More Chance
10. Let's Do It
11. Poor Butterfly
12. Sweet Georgia Brown
13. The Sheik of Araby
14. These Foolish Things

== Personnel ==
- Bucky Pizzarelli – guitar
- John Pizzarelli – guitar
