= Stash Records =

American jazz record label (1975–1998)

- Founded: 1975
- Founder: Bernard Brightman
- Defunct: 1998
- Status: Inactive
- Genre: Jazz
- Country of origin: United States
- Location: New York City

Stash Records was an American independent jazz record label based in New York City that flourished from 1975 through the late 1990s. Its name was drawn from the subject of its first album, Reefer Songs (1976). Bernie Brightman (né Bernard Benjamin Brightman; 1921–2003) founded the label in 1975, structured it as a New York entity May 4, 1977 – Stash Records, Inc. – and operated it about until 1998. The corporation dissolved March 28, 2001.

== History ==
=== Pre-Stash Records ===
Before founding Stash Records, Bernard Brightman worked with his father's company, Brightman Products Co., Inc., maker Britemode "petites" and other ladies handbags and accessories – headquartered at 385 Fifth Avenue (at 36th Street, southeast corner) (1955) and 393 Fifth Avenue (1961), with showrooms in Chicago, Dallas, Los Angeles, Miami, and Pittsburgh. Bernard's father, Max Brightman (1896–1962), founded and headed Brightman Products. When Max died in 1962, Bernard, his mother (Max's wife), Anna Brightman (née Latter; 1892–1896), and Bernard's two siblings, Abraham (1918–2002) and Sylvia (subsequent surnames – Mazer, then Lubars; 1916–1885), helped sustain the firm for almost a decade. They sold the firm in the early 1970s.

=== Stash Records ===
After the family business was sold, Bernard Brightman founded Stash Records in 1975. Initially located in Brooklyn, Stash moved to 611 Broadway, Suite 411, New York City, then to 140 West 22nd Street, 12th floor, New York City. Founded as an independent jazz label – focused on non-commercial vintage jazz and blues. From the strength of profits from its early releases, particularly the album Reefer Songs, Stash evolved into a record producer of jazz artists, including Hank Jones, Bucky and John Pizzarelli, Hilton Ruiz, Louis Bellson, Branford Marsalis, David Murray, Doc Cheatham, Buck Clayton, Helen Forrest, Chris Connor, Mel Torme, Al Grey, Jimmie Rowles, Steve Turre, and Dardanelle Hadley (aka Dardanelle Breckenridge, née Marcia Marie Mullen; 1917–1997) with Vivian Lord (born 1929; mother of Tom and Chris Lord-Alge).

In 1992, Stash launched its mail-order division. Bernard (Bernie) Brightman (1921–2003) was the founder and ran it until it closed. In 1986, Stash announced a discovery of a tape featuring Charlie Parker in a hotel with sidemen from the 1943 Earl Hines band. In 1994, Stash's Daybreak label released a recording of President Bill Clinton playing the saxophone with a six-piece jazz combo on a visit to Prague.

=== Jass Records ===
Under the imprint of Jass Records, Stash released, among other things, themed compilations, including collections relating to women in jazz. Several albums in particular, including Forty Years of Women in Jazz (1989; OCLC 23470354), have received wide acclaim from historians, critics, and record collectors.

=== Vintage Jazz Classics ===
VJC releases include several radio broadcast transcriptions

=== Natasha Imports ===
Natasha Imports released several recordings from the 1940s and 1950s by artists that included Stan Kenton, Frank Sinatra (when he was young), and Dizzy Gillespie.

=== Viper's Nest Records ===
Viper's Nest Records released a few collections with comical and/or taboo titles relating to weed or sex, namely When Hemp Was Hip and The Copulatin' Collection.

=== Legacy of Bernie Brightman ===
As stated in an obituary written by Will Friedwald, a jazz critic who had worked for Stash:

Bernard Brightman, who died Sunday at age 82, founded Stash Records, one of the most vibrant jazz labels of the 1970s and 1980s – and in its original conception, the most salacious. Having partaken of both the big bands and the potent marijuana easily (and legally) available in Harlem in the 1930s, Brightman knew how closely they were linked. He was the first to realize, in the 1970s, that sex and drugs could be used to help sell vintage jazz and blues to younger, rock-oriented audiences.

— Will Friedwald, The New York Sun, 2003

== Labels associated with Stash and affiliated entities ==
Owned
Jass Records; 1985–2001	Jass Records, Inc., a New York entity, incorporated June 21, 1985, dissolved June 27, 2001; Bernard Brighton, CEO; specialized in reissue compilations and releases of archival material; subsidiary and sub-label of Stash
Vintage Jazz Classics; 1990–1995	Vintage Jazz Classics Ltd. (VJC), a New York entity, incorporated February 16, 1990, dissolved December 27, 1995; subsidiary and sub-label of Stash
Natasha Imports; 1993–1997	Natasha Imports Inc., a New York entity, incorporated February 12, 1993, dissolved September 24, 1997; Bernard Brighton, CEO; subsidiary and sub-label of Stash
Daybreak M.O. 1994–1999	Daybreak M.O. Inc., a New York entity, incorporated April 29, 1994, dissolved December 29, 1999, doing business as Daybreak Records (M.O. stands for "mail order"); subsidiary and sub-label of Stash
Viper's Nest Records; 1994–1999	Viper's Nest Records, Inc.; Viper's Nest Records released, among other categories, a "Gold," "Discovery," and "Collectors Label" series; "viper" is a direct reference to the traditional Harlem jazz-age term for a pothead
Cedar Records; 19??–19??
Labels distributed
Hoy Hoy Records; 1994–1999	Hoy Hoy, Inc., was a Vermont corporation, based in Brattleboro, formed February 11, 1992, and terminated exactly a year later. Hoy Hoy Distributors was based in Hoosick Falls, New York; both were owned by Morgan Wright; Stash had been distributing Hoy Hoy's Rock Before Elvis; but in 1995, Hoy Hoy was sold out and out of print; so Stash licensed the compilation from Hoy Hoy released it as The Hoy Hoy Collection Rock Before Elvis. According to Wright's website (www.hoyhoy.com), "Hoy Hoy" was an expression commonly used in R&B lyrics from about 1945 to through 1951. It started with Cab Calloway's record "Hoy Hoy," in 1937, and gained more fame with the platter "The Honeydripper" by Joe Liggins, which kept the #1 spot for 18 weeks in the summer of 1945. In the recording, "hoy" is repeated many times in the bridge. Between 1945 and 1951, hundreds of R&B records, according to Wright, included the phrase in the lyrics, but after 1951 the expression wasn't heard much, since by then everything was changing over to doo-wop vocal groups, and the teenagers of that era probably didn't think the expression was cool anymore. The origin of the phrase "Hoy Hoy" in black music of the 1940s is unknown. Bear Family Records GmbH, Hambergen, Germany, has been distributing the catalog of Hoy Hoy The above described Hoy Hoy, Inc., is not connected with the current Tokyo-based Hoy-Hoy Records founded December 2014

== Personnel ==
Bernard Brightman:	Bernard Benjamin Brightman (January 24, 1921 Brooklyn – November 9, 2003 Manhattan, New York); President; long before becoming a record producer (two weeks after the attack on Pearl Harbor), Brightman enlisted in the United States Army Air Corps, and served in the 17th Bombardment Group
Fred Brightman:	Fredrick D. Brightman (born 1954); Vice President A&R; Bernard's son
Natasha Brightman:	Annetta Natasha Brightman, MSW, CSW, LCSW (born 1930); Vice President; Bernard's widow (his second marriage); she is licensed in New York as a Clinical Social Worker, qualified in Psychotherapy, and is a Fellow of AIPP (American Institute of Psychotherapy and Psychoanalysis)
Will Friedwald:	William W. Friedwald (born 1961); Vice President; he often wrote liner notes and served as associate producer; he is currently a music critic
Jim Eigo:	James W. Eigo (born 1947); CEO Mail Order Division; currently a jazz publicist connected with Jazz Promo Services, Warwick, New York and ejazznews.com
Amjad Ali:	Office Manager
