= Meets the Beatles =

Studio album by John Pizzarelli
- Released: August 25, 1998
- Genre: Swing; pop rock
- Label: RCA
- Producer: Don Sebesky; John Pizzarelli

John Pizzarelli chronology
Our Love Is Here to Stay (1997)	Meets the Beatles (1998)	P.S. Mr. Cole (1999)

Professional ratings
Review scores
Source	Rating
AllMusic	4/5 stars

John Pizzarelli Meets the Beatles is a studio album of tributes to The Beatles performed by John Pizzarelli and his working trio of brother Martin Pizzarelli and pianist Ray Kennedy. The selections—all arranged and conducted by Don Sebesky, who also produced the album—are all given a swinging dimension.

== Track listing ==
1. "Can't Buy Me Love"
2. "I've Just Seen a Face"
3. "Here Comes the Sun"
4. "Things We Said Today"
5. "You've Got to Hide Your Love Away"
6. "Eleanor Rigby"
7. "And I Love Her"
8. "When I'm Sixty-Four"
9. "Oh! Darling"
10. "Get Back"
11. "The Long and Winding Road"
12. "For No One"

== Personnel ==
- John Pizzarelli – vocals, guitar
- Don Sebesky – arranger, conductor, producer
- Martin Pizzarelli – double-bass
- Ray Kennedy – piano
- Gary Keller (saxophone)
- Chuck Wilson (saxophone)
- Kenny Berger (saxophone)
- Scott Robinson (saxophone)
- Ken Peplowski (clarinet)
- Alan Raph – trombone
- John Mosca (trombone)
- Peter Gordon (French horn)
- Sammy Figueroa (percussion)
- Tony Tedesco (drums)

+ The Orchestra :

- Xin M. Zhao (violin), Belinda Whitney-Barratt (violin), Alfred V. Brown (viola), Kenneth Burward-Hoy (viola), Juliet Haffner (viola), Richard Sortomme (violin), Laura J. Seaton (violin), Lisa Matricardi (violin), Laura S. Oatts (violin), Joel Pitchon (violin), Andrea Ingrid Schultz (violin), Maxine L. Roach (viola), Mitsue Takayama (viola), Joseph Bongiorno (bass), Melissa Meell (cello), John Miller (bass), Douglas W. Romoff (bass), Stacey G. Shames (harp), Jesse Levy (cello), Jeanne M. LeBlanc (cello), Leslie J. Tomkins (viola), Liuh-Wen Ting (viola), Stephanie L. Cummins (cello), Adam Grabois (cello), Chungsun Kim (cello), Elizabeth Lim-Dutton (violin), Katherine Naomi Katz (violin), Rick S. Dolan (violin), Avril Brown (violin), Max Ellen (violin), Barry Finclair (violin), Evan Johnson (violin), Sanford W. Allen (violin), Martin Agee (violin), Harry Allen (tenor saxophone), Karen Karlsrud (violin), Andy Fusco (alto saxophone)
