= Dream (musical) =

1997 musical revue

Dream is a musical revue based on the songs of Johnny Mercer. The book is by Jack Wrangler and co-producer Louise Westergaard. The show ran on Broadway in 1997.

== Production ==
The revue opened on Broadway on April 3, 1997 at the Royale Theatre after twenty-four previews. Directed and choreographed by Wayne Cilento, the costumes are by Ann Hould-Ward, lighting by Ken Billington and sets by David Mitchell. The cast featured Lesley Ann Warren, John Pizzarelli, Margaret Whiting, Jessica Molaskey and Brooks Ashmanskas.

It closed on July 6, 1997 after 109 performances.

== Songs ==
All lyrics by Mercer.

Song	Music
"Dream"	Mercer
"Lazybones"	Hoagy Carmichael
"On Behalf of the Traveling Salesmen"	Walter Donaldson
"Pardon My Southern Accent"	Matt Malneck
"You Must Have Been a Beautiful Baby"	Harry Warren
"Have You Got Any Castles, Baby?"	Richard Whiting
"Goody, Goody"	Malneck
"Skylark"	Carmichael
"The Dixieland Band"	Bernie Hanighen
"I Had Myself a True Love / I Wonder What Became Of"	Harold Arlen
"Jamboree Jones Jive"	Mercer
"Fools Rush In"	Rube Bloom
"Come Rain or Come Shine"	Arlen
"Out of This World"	Arlen
"I Remember You"	Victor Schertzinger
"Blues in the Night"	Arlen
"One for My Baby"	Arlen
"You Were Never Lovelier"	Jerome Kern
"Satin Doll"	Billy Strayhorn and Duke Ellington
"I'm Old Fashioned"	Kern
"Dearly Beloved"	Kern
"This Time the Dream's on Me"	Arlen
"Something's Gotta Give"	Mercer
"Too Marvelous for Words"	Whiting
"I Thought About You"	Jimmy Van Heusen
"And the Angels Sing"	Ziggy Elman
"The Fleet's In"	Schertzinger
"G.I. Jive"	Mercer
"I'm Doin' It for Defense"	Arlen
"Tangerine"	Schertzinger
"Day In, Day Out"	Bloom
"Jeepers Creepers"	Warren
"That Old Black Magic"	Arlen
"Laura"	David Raksin
"You Go Your Way"	Mercer
"My Shining Hour"	Arlen
"Hooray for Hollywood"	Whiting
"Accentuate the Positive"	Arlen
"In the Cool, Cool, Cool of the Evening"	Carmichael
"Charade / Days of Wine and Roses"	Henry Mancini
"Moon River"	Henry Mancini
"On the Atchison, Topeka and the Santa Fe"	Warren

== Awards and nominations ==
- Tony Award for Best Choreography (Wayne Cilento, nominee)
