= Dear Mr. Cole =

1994 tribute album by John Pizzarelli

Studio album by John Pizzarelli
- Released: November 23, 1994
- Genre: Jazz; swing
- Length: 62:20
- Label: Novus
- Producer: John Pizzarelli; Mike Stoller; Ikuyoshi Hirakawa; Brooks Arthur

John Pizzarelli chronology
Naturally (1993)	Dear Mr. Cole (1994)	New Standards (1994)

Professional ratings
Review scores
Source	Rating
Allmusic	4/5 stars
The Penguin Guide to Jazz Recordings	3/4 stars

Dear Mr. Cole is a Nat King Cole tribute album by jazz guitarist John Pizzarelli. Pizzarelli is accompanied by pianist Benny Green, and bassist Christian McBride on all but one song.

== Track listing ==
1. "Style Is Coming Back in Style" (Jerry Leiber, Mike Stoller) – 2:42
2. "What Can I Say After I Say I'm Sorry?" (Walter Donaldson, Abe Lyman) – 2:24
3. "Little Girl" (Francis Henry, Matt Hyde) – 2:51
4. "You Must Be Blind" (Nat King Cole) – 3:39
5. "Sweet Georgia Brown" (Ben Bernie, Kenneth Casey, Maceo Pinkard) – 5:47
6. "It's Only a Paper Moon" (Harold Arlen, Yip Harburg, Billy Rose) – 2:33
7. "September Song" (Maxwell Anderson, Kurt Weill) – 3:30
8. "On the Sunny Side of the Street" (Dorothy Fields, Jimmy McHugh) – 2:54
9. "Nature Boy" (eden ahbez) – 3:44
10. "This Way Out" (Nat King Cole) – 4:49
11. "Too Marvelous for Words" (Johnny Mercer, Richard A. Whiting) – 2:05
12. "Route 66" (Bobby Troup) – 6:42
13. "Sweet Lorraine" (Carter Burwell, Mitchell Parish) – 3:29
14. "Straighten Up and Fly Right" (Nat King Cole, Irving Mills) – 5:08
15. "Honeysuckle Rose" (Andy Razaf, Fats Waller) – 2:54
16. "L-O-V-E" (Milt Gabler, Bert Kaempfert) – 2:18
17. "Unforgettable" (Irving Gordon) – 1:58
18. "Portrait of Jenny" (Newman) – 2:53

== Personnel ==
- John Pizzarelli – vocals, guitar
- Benny Green – piano
- Ray Kennedy – piano
- Christian McBride – double-bass
- Martin Pizzarelli – double bass
- John Guerin – drums
