= Green Guitar Blues =

Studio album by Bucky Pizzarelli
- Released: 1972
- Recorded: March 5 – June 30, 1972
- Genre: Jazz
- Label: Monmouth Evergreen

Bucky Pizzarelli chronology
Green Guitar Blues (1972)	Playing the Piano Music of Bix Beiderbecke (1974)

Green Guitar Blues is an album by jazz guitarist Bucky Pizzarelli that was released in 1972 by Monmouth Green.

== Reception ==
Professional ratings
Review scores
Source	Rating
AllMusic	4/5 stars

At AllMusic, critic Scott Yanow called the album "quite enjoyable" and "melodic and concise versions of a variety of songs that Pizzarelli enjoys, including swing standards, two originals, a few medleys and a couple of classical numbers." Yanow also notes a "particular highlight is the Dick McDonough-Carl Kress piece 'Chicken a La Swing', which Bucky plays in a guitar duet with his 14-year-old daughter Mary Pizzarelli."

== Track listing ==
No.	Title	Writer(s)	Length
1.	"Tangerine"	Victor Schertzinger; Johnny Mercer	2:10
2.	"What Are You Doing the Rest of Your Life?"	Alan Bergman; Marilyn Bergman; Michel Legrand	2:37
3.	"Breakfast at Tiffany's/Dreamsville"	Henry Mancini	3:11
4.	"Bizarre"		2:24
5.	"The Summer Knows"	Bergman; Bergman; Legrand	2:00
6.	"Green Guitar Blues"	Pizzarelli	3:29
7.	"I Don't Know How to Love Him"	Andrew Lloyd Webber; Tim Rice	2:07
8.	"Satin Doll"	Duke Ellington; Billy Strayhorn	3:25
9.	"Cry Me a River/Girl Talk"	Arthur Hamilton; Neal Hefti	3:16
10.	"Adelita/Prelude No. 4"		3:49
11.	"Chicken a La Swing"	Dick McDonough; Carl Kress	1:52
12.	"Goodbye"		2:12

== Personnel ==
- Bucky Pizzarelli – guitar
- Mary Pizzarelli – guitar
- George Duvivier – double bass
- Don Lamond – drums
