= Joe Mooney (musician) =

American accordionist, organist, and vocalist

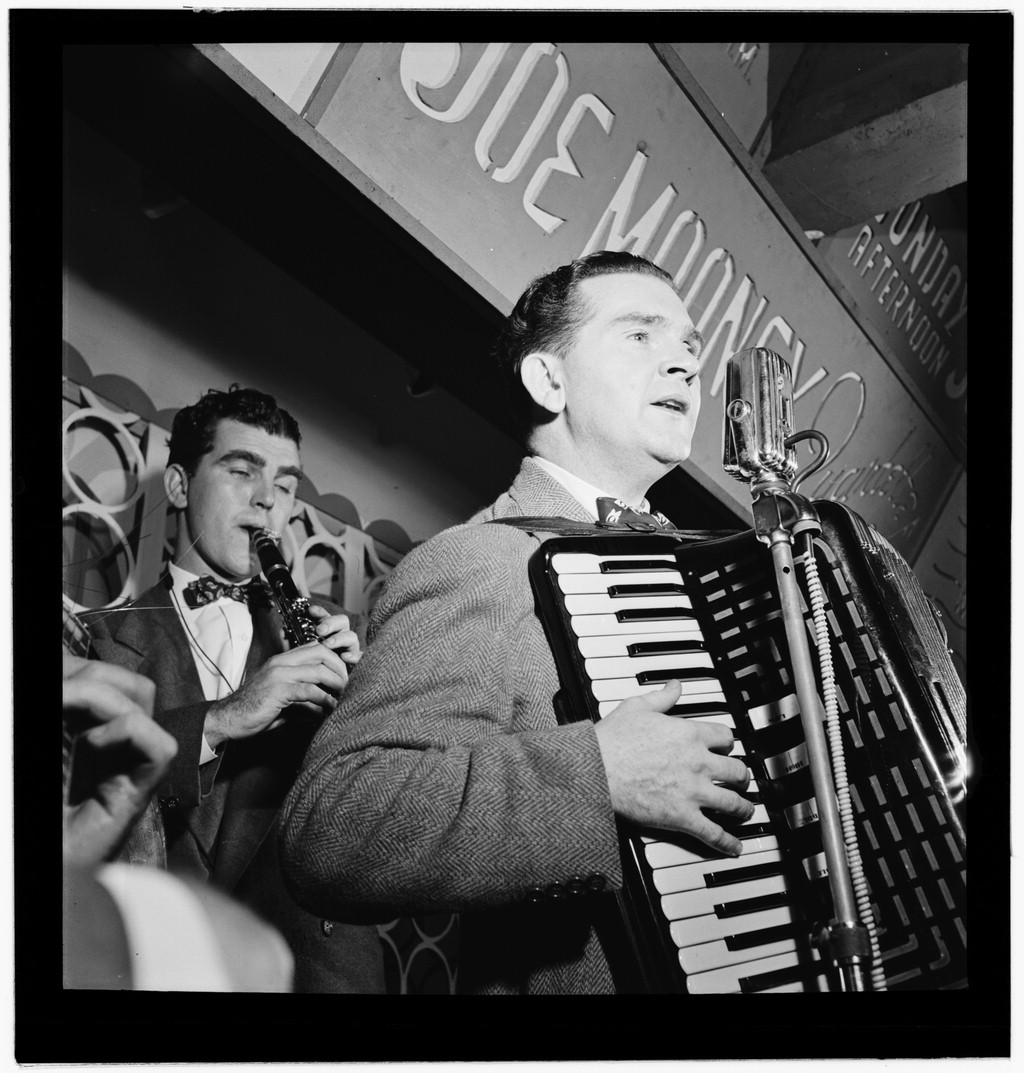
- Joe Mooney (right) and Andy Fitzgerald, New York, c. October 1946; Photograph by William P. Gottlieb

Background information
- Born: March 14, 1911; Paterson, New Jersey, U.S.
- Died: May 12, 1975 (aged 64) Fort Lauderdale, Florida
- Genres: Chamber jazz
- Occupation: Musician
- Instruments: Accordion, organ
- Years active: 1920s–1960s
- Label: Decca

Joe Mooney (March 14, 1911 – May 12, 1975) was an American jazz and pop accordionist, organist, and vocalist.

== Biography ==
Mooney was born in Paterson, New Jersey, United States. He went blind when he was around 10 years of age.

Mooney's first job, at age 12, was playing the piano for requests called in to a local radio station. He and his brother, Dan, played together on radio broadcasts in the late 1920s, and recorded between 1929 and 1931 as the Sunshine Boys and the Melotone Boys; both sang while Joe accompanied on piano. They continued performing together on WLW in Cincinnati until 1936, after which time Dan Mooney left the music industry.

In 1937, Mooney began working as a pianist and arranger for Frank Dailey, a role he reprised with Buddy Rogers in 1938. Through the early 1940s he arranged for Paul Whiteman, Vincent Lopez, Larry Clinton, Les Brown, and The Modernaires.

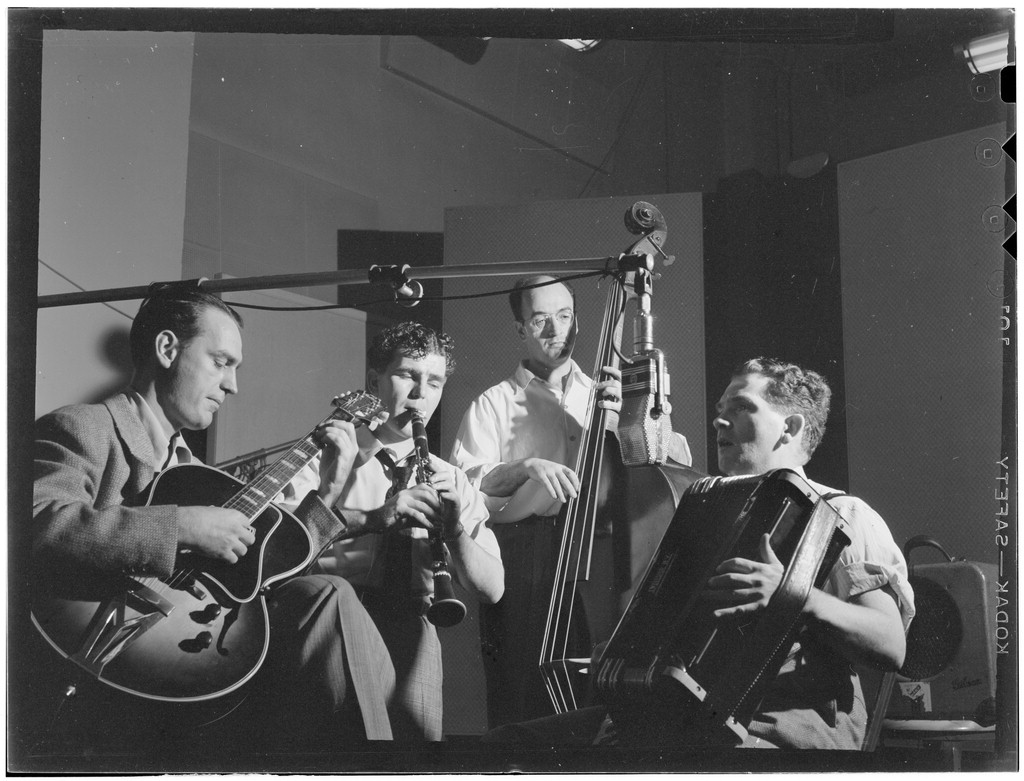
The Joe Mooney Quartet, c. Dec. 1946: Jack Hotop (guitar), Andy Fitzgerald (clarinet), Gaeton (Gate) Frega (bass), and Mooney (accordion). Photograph by William P. Gottlieb.

He put together his own quartet in 1943; he sang and played accordion with accompaniment on guitar, bass, and clarinet. This group experienced considerable success in the United States in the last half of the 1940s. In 1946, a newspaper columnist wrote that Mooney's music "has the most cynical hot jazz critics describing it in joyous terms such as 'exciting,' 'new,' 'the best thing since Ellington,' [and] 'as new to jazz as the first Dixieland jazz band was when it first arrived.'" As for Mooney himself, the columnist wrote that he "played in virtuoso fashion ... a fellow who knows not only his instrument, but jazz music, both to just about the ultimate degree."

In the 1950s, Mooney sang with the Sauter-Finegan Orchestra, and he played with Johnny Smith in 1953. After moving to Florida in 1954 he concentrated more on organ. He recorded again in 1956.

In 1963, a group of friends formed a company to produce a record, "Joe Mooney and His Friends." He recorded again in the middle of the 1960s.

Joe Mooney died at age 64, on May 12, 1975, in Fort Lauderdale, Florida, after a stroke.

== Discography ==
- You Go to My Head (Decca, 1955)
- On the Rocks (Decca, 1957)
- Lush Life (Atlantic, 1958)
- The Greatness of Joe Mooney (Columbia, 1963)
- The Happiness of Joe Mooney (Columbia, 1965)
- The Sunshine Boys (Retrieval, 1987)
