= John Pizzarelli =

American jazz guitarist and vocalist

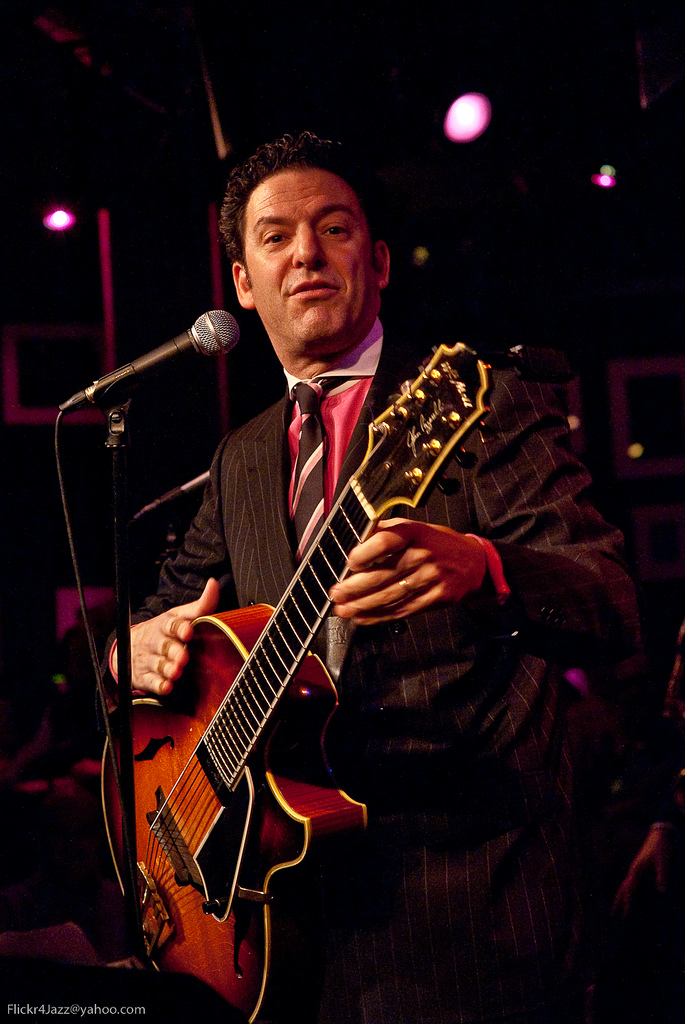

Background information
- Born: John Paul Pizzarelli Jr. April 6, 1960 (age 66); Paterson, New Jersey, U.S.
- Genres: Jazz, swing
- Occupations: Musician, singer, composer
- Instruments: Guitar, vocals
- Years active: 1980–present
- Labels: P-Vine, Chesky, Novus, RCA, Telarc, Arbors, Concord
- Website: www.johnpizzarelli.com

John Paul Pizzarelli Jr. (born April 6, 1960) is an American jazz guitarist and vocalist. He has recorded over twenty solo albums and has appeared on more than forty albums by other recording artists, including Paul McCartney, James Taylor, Rosemary Clooney; his father, jazz guitarist Bucky Pizzarelli; and his wife, singer Jessica Molaskey.

== Early life ==
The son of swing guitarist Bucky Pizzarelli, John Pizzarelli was born in Paterson, New Jersey. He started on guitar when he was six and played trumpet through his college years. He attended Don Bosco Preparatory High School, an all-boys Catholic school. In his teens, he performed with Benny Goodman, Les Paul, Zoot Sims, Slam Stewart, and Clark Terry.

Pizzarelli attended the University of Tampa and William Paterson University, though he has said that his most important teacher was his father from 1980 to 1990. During the 1980s, he established himself as a jazz guitarist and a vocalist. He released his debut solo album, I'm Hip (Please Don't Tell My Father), in 1983.

== Career ==
In 1982, when he was just 22, Pizzarelli founded a pizza chain in the Dominican Republic named after himself. Pizzarelli has gone on to become one of the most important chains in the country, after it was purchased by the Bonarelli family, a Dominican family with Italian roots.

During the 1990s, Pizzarelli played in a trio with Ray Kennedy and Martin Pizzarelli, his younger brother. In the summer of 1993, Pizzarelli was the opening act for Frank Sinatra and four years later, Pizzarelli starred in Dream, a Broadway show devoted to the music of Johnny Mercer. He has named Nat King Cole as the inspiration for his career and honors that influence in the albums Dear Mr. Cole (BMG, 1994) and P.S. Mr. Cole (RCA, 1999). He has also recorded tribute albums to Frank Sinatra, Duke Ellington, Antônio Carlos Jobim, Richard Rodgers, and Paul McCartney. He and his father accompanied Annie Ross on her album To Lady with Love (Red Anchor, 2014), a tribute to Billie Holiday that Ross recorded when she was eighty-four.

He has hosted a national radio show, Radio Deluxe with John Pizzarelli, with his wife, singer and actress Jessica Molaskey. Other musicians he has worked with include George Shearing, Rosemary Clooney, Johnny Frigo, Buddy DeFranco, Jack Gibbons, the Clayton-Hamilton Jazz Orchestra, the Boston Pops Orchestra, and the Cincinnati Pops Orchestra.

He sang the 1999 big-band jingle for Foxwoods Resort Casino, titled "The Wonder of It All."

Pizzarelli was a co-producer of the James Taylor album American Standard, which was nominated and won the Grammy in the category of "Best Traditional Pop Vocal Album" on November 24, 2020. During Covid, he recorded the album, Better Days Ahead (Guitar Takes of Pat Metheny).

== Personal life ==
John Pizzarelli and his wife Jessica Molaskey own a vacation cabin overlooking Barrett Pond in Carmel, New York. They often co-host their syndicated radio show, Radio Deluxe with John Pizzarelli from the cabin and do much of their musical work there.

Pizzarelli has at least one child, Madeleine Elizabeth Pizzarelli, described in The New York Times as "a professional singer, songwriter and guitarist."

Pizzarelli's father died on April 1, 2020, from complications to COVID-19. Pizzarelli's mother died one week later on April 8, 2020.

== Discography ==
=== As leader/co-leader ===
- I'm Hip (Please Don't Tell My Father) (Stash, 1983)
- Hit That Jive, Jack! (Stash, 1985)
- Sing! Sing! Sing! (Stash, 1987)
- My Blue Heaven (Chesky, 1990)
- All of Me (Novus, 1992)
- Naturally (Novus, 1993)
- New Standards (Novus, 1994)
- Dear Mr. Cole (Novus, 1994)
- After Hours (Novus, 1996)
- Let's Share Christmas (RCA, 1996)
- Our Love Is Here to Stay (RCA, 1997)
- Meets the Beatles (RCA, 1998)
- P.S. Mr. Cole (RCA, 1999)
- Kisses in the Rain (Telarc, 2000)
- Let There Be Love (Telarc, 2000)
- Live At Foxwoods Resort Casino (Telarc, 2002)
- The Rare Delight of You (Telarc, 2002) with George Shearing
- Live at Birdland (Telarc, 2003)
- Bossa Nova (Telarc, 2004)
- Knowing You (Telarc, 2005)
- Just Friends with Rick Haydon (Mel Bay, 2006)
- Dear Mr. Sinatra (Telarc, 2006) with Clayton/Hamilton Jazz Orchestra
- With a Song in My Heart (Telarc, 2008)
- Rockin' in Rhythm: A Tribute to Duke Ellington (Telarc, 2010)
- Double Exposure with Tessa Souter (Telarc, 2012)
- John Pizzarelli Salutes Johnny Mercer: Live at Birdland (Vector, 2015)
- Midnight McCartney (Concord, 2015)
- Sinatra & Jobim @ 50 (Concord, 2017)
- For Centennial Reasons: 100 Year Salute to Nat King Cole (Ghostlight, 2019)
- Better Days Ahead: Solo Guitar Takes on Pat Metheny (Ghostlight, 2021)
- Stage & Screen (Palmetto, 2023)
- Dear Mr. Bennett (Green Hill Music, 2026)

With Bucky Pizzarelli

- Nirvana, Bucky Pizzarelli (Delta, 1995)
- Contrasts (Arbors, 1999)
- Passion Guitars (Groove Jams, 1999)
- Twogether (Victrola, 2001)
- Around the World in 80 Years, Bucky Pizzarelli (Victoria, 2006)
- Generations (Arbors, 2007)
- Sunday at Pete's, The Pizzarelli Boys (Challenge, 2007)
- Pizzarelli Party, Arbors All Stars (Arbors, 2009)
- Diggin' Up Bones, Bucky Pizzarelli (Arbors, 2009)
- Desert Island Dreamers, The Pizzarelli Boys (Arbors, 2010)
- Back in the Saddle Again, Bucky Pizarelli (Arbors, 2010)
- Family Fugue (Arbors, 2011)

With Jessica Molaskey

- Pentimento (Image, 2002)
- A Good Day (PS Classics, 2003)
- Make Believe (PS Classics, 2004)
- Sitting in Limbo (PS Classics, 2007)
- A Kiss to Build a Dream On (Arbors, 2008)

=== As producer or co-producer ===
With James Taylor and Dave O'Donnell

- American Standards (Fantasy, 2020)

=== As sideman or guest ===
With Monty Alexander

- My America (Telarc, 2002)

With Harry Allen

- Are You Having Any Fun? (Audiophile, 1994)
- Harry Allen Meets John Pizzarelli Trio (BMG, 1996)
- Tenors Anyone? (Slider, 2004)

With Sam Arlen

- Arlen Plays Arlen: The Timeless Tribute to Harold Arlen (Arbors, 2005)

With Debby Boone

- Reflections of Rosemary (Concord, 2005)

With Cheryl Bentyne

- The Book of Love (Telarc, 2006)

With Ray Brown

- Some of My Best Friends Are...Guitarists (Telarc, 2002)

With Rosemary Clooney

- Do You Miss New York? (Concord, 1993)
- Brazil (Concord, 2000)

With Kristin Chenoweth

- A Lovely Way to Spend Christmas (Sony, 2008)

With Buddy DeFranco

- Cookin' the Books (Arbors, 2004)

With Karen Egert

- That Thing Called Love (Egert Productions, 2007)

With Johnny Frigo

- Live from Studio A in New York City (Chesky, 1989)

With Natalie Cole

- Stardust (Elektra, 1996)

With Sara Gazarek

- Blossom & Bee (Palmetto, 2012)

With Stephane Grappelli

- Live at the Blue Note (Telarc, 1995)

With Skitch Henderson and Bucky Pizzarelli

- Legends (Arbors, 2003)

With Hilary Kole

- Haunted Heart (Justin Time, 2009)

With Erich Kunzel

- Got Swing! (Telarc, 2002)
- Christmastime Is Here (Telarc, 2006)

With The Manhattan Transfer

- Vibrate (Telarc, 2004)

With Paul McCartney

- Kisses on the Bottom (Hear Music, 2012)

With Jane Monheit

- Home (EmArcy, 2010)

With Rickie Lee Jones

- It's Like This (Artemis, 2000)

With Donnie O'Brien

- Meets Manhattan Swing in a Basie Mood (Arbors, 2003)

With Curtis Stigers

- Real Emotional (Concord, 2007)

With James Taylor

- October Road (Columbia, 2002)
- A Christmas Album (Hallmark Cards, 2004)
- James Taylor at Christmas (Columbia, 2006)
- American Standards (Fantasy, 2020)

With Aaron Weinstein

- A Handful of Stars (Arbors, 2005)
- Blue Too (Arbors, 2007)
