= Harry Allen (musician) =

American jazz tenor saxophonist (born 1966)

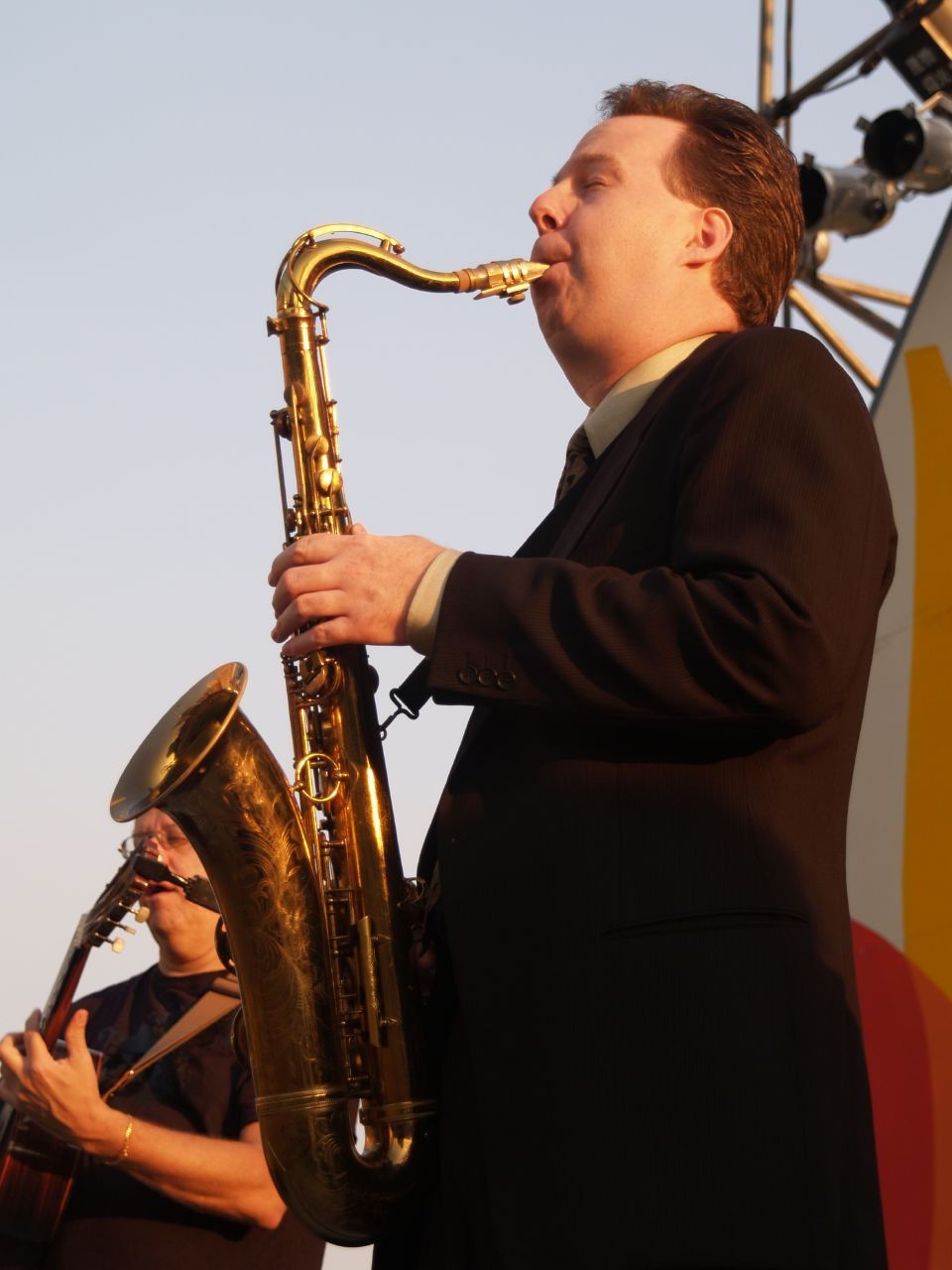
- Harry Allen in 2006

Background information
- Born: October 12, 1966 (age 59)
- Genres: Jazz
- Occupation: Musician
- Instrument: Saxophone
- Labels: Arbors, Mastermix
- Website: www.harryallenjazz.com

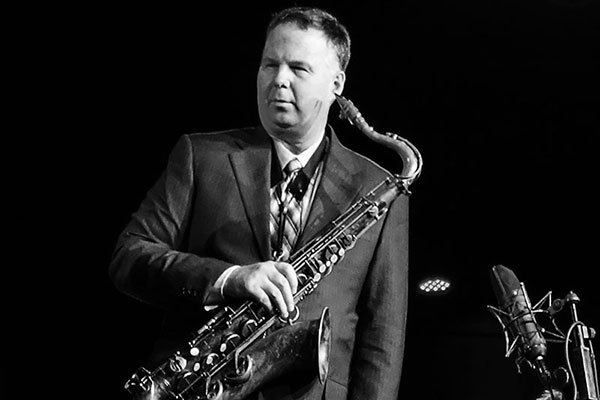
Allen in Aarhus, Denmark, 2015

Harry Allen (born October 12, 1966) is an American jazz tenor saxophonist born in Washington, D.C. Allen plays mainstream jazz and bossa nova. He has performed live and recorded with Scott Hamilton, a tenor saxophonist to whom Allen has frequently been compared. He is best known for his work with John Colianni, Dori Caymmi, Keith Ingham, John Pizzarelli, and Bucky Pizzarelli.

== Early life and career ==
Allen's father, Maurice, was a big band drummer. As a child, his father played records for him; these included recordings of tenor saxophonist Paul Gonsalves, which made a lasting impression.

In high school he was an exceptional talent able to play tunes such as Body and Soul in the style of tenor players Coleman Hawkins, Ben Webster, and Flip Phillips. While in high school Allen was also influenced by recordings of Scott Hamilton.

Allen graduated from Rutgers University in 1988.

Allen was described by C. Michael Bailey as "the 'Frank Sinatra' of the tenor saxophone: a master interpreter of standards" in 2008. Along with Scott Hamilton, Allen was considered by British critic Dave Gelly in 2004 to be one of the "finest exponents of swing tenor alive today" in a review of their album Heavy Juice.

== Discography ==
=== As leader/co-leaders ===
- How Long Has This Been Going On? (Progressive, 1989)
- The King (Nagel Heyer, 1994)
- I'll Never Be the Same (Master Mix, 1994)
- Blue Skies: Jazz Ballads from the 1930s to Today (John Marks, 1994)
- Are You Having Any Fun? -- A Celebration of the Music of Sammy Fain with Keith Ingham Quintet (Audiophile, 1994)
- Harry Allen Meets John Pizzarelli Trio with John Pizzarelli (BMG, 1996)
- Tenors Anyone? (BMG, 1997) – recorded in 1996
- Here's to Zoot (BMG, 1997)
- The Music of the Trumpet Kings with Randy Sandke (Nagel-Heyer, 1997)
- Day Dream with Tommy Flanagan (BMG/Novus, 1998)
- Eu Nao Quero Dancar (I Won't Dance) (RCA Victor/BMG/Novus, 1998)
- Harry Allen Plays Ellington Songs with The Bill Charlap Trio (RCA Victor, 2000) – recorded in 1999
- Christmas in Swingtime (BMG, 2000)
- Dreamer (BMG, 2001)
- I Love Mancini (BMG, 2002)
- I Can See Forever (BMG, 2002)
- The Harry Allen Quartet (2003)
- If Ever You Were Mine (BMG, 2003)
- Plays The Hits of Stage & Screen with The John Pizzarelli Trio (BMG, 2004)
- Tenors Anyone? (Slider Music, 2004)
- Heavy Juice with Scott Hamilton (Concord, 2004)
- Isn't This a Lovely Day with Hank Jones Trio (BMG, 2004)
- Jazz for the Soul (McMahon Jazz Medicine, 2005)
- Barnestorming with Alan Barnes (Woodville, 2007) – recorded in 2006
- Viva! Bossa Nova (BMG, 2008)
- New York State of Mind (Challenge, 2009)
- When Larry Met Harry with Larry Goldings (Cafe Society, 2010)
- The Harry Allen Quintet Plays Music from The Sound of Music (Arbors, 2011)
- Live at Feinstein's at Loews Regency with Rebecca Kilgore (Arbors, 2011) – live
- Blues for Pres and Teddy (Swingbros, 2011) – featuring Bill Charlap
- I Walk with Music: The Hoagy Carmichael Songbook with Rossano Sportiello, Joel Forbes (Gac, 2013)
- For George, Cole and Duke with Ehud Asherie, Nicki Parrott, Chuck Redd (Blue Heron, 2014)
- Something about Jobim with Joyce, Tutty Moreno, &c (Stunt, 2015)
- Live! with Scott Hamilton (Gac, 2016) – live
- The Candy Men (Arbors, 2016) – recorded in 2015
- Can You Love Me Once More with Judy Carmichael (Gac, 2016)
- French Lullaby (Venus, 2018) – recorded in 2017
- Three Tenors, Like The Brightest Star with Ken Peplowski, Scott Hamilton (Venus, 2019)
