= Bucky Pizzarelli =

American jazz guitarist (1926–2020)

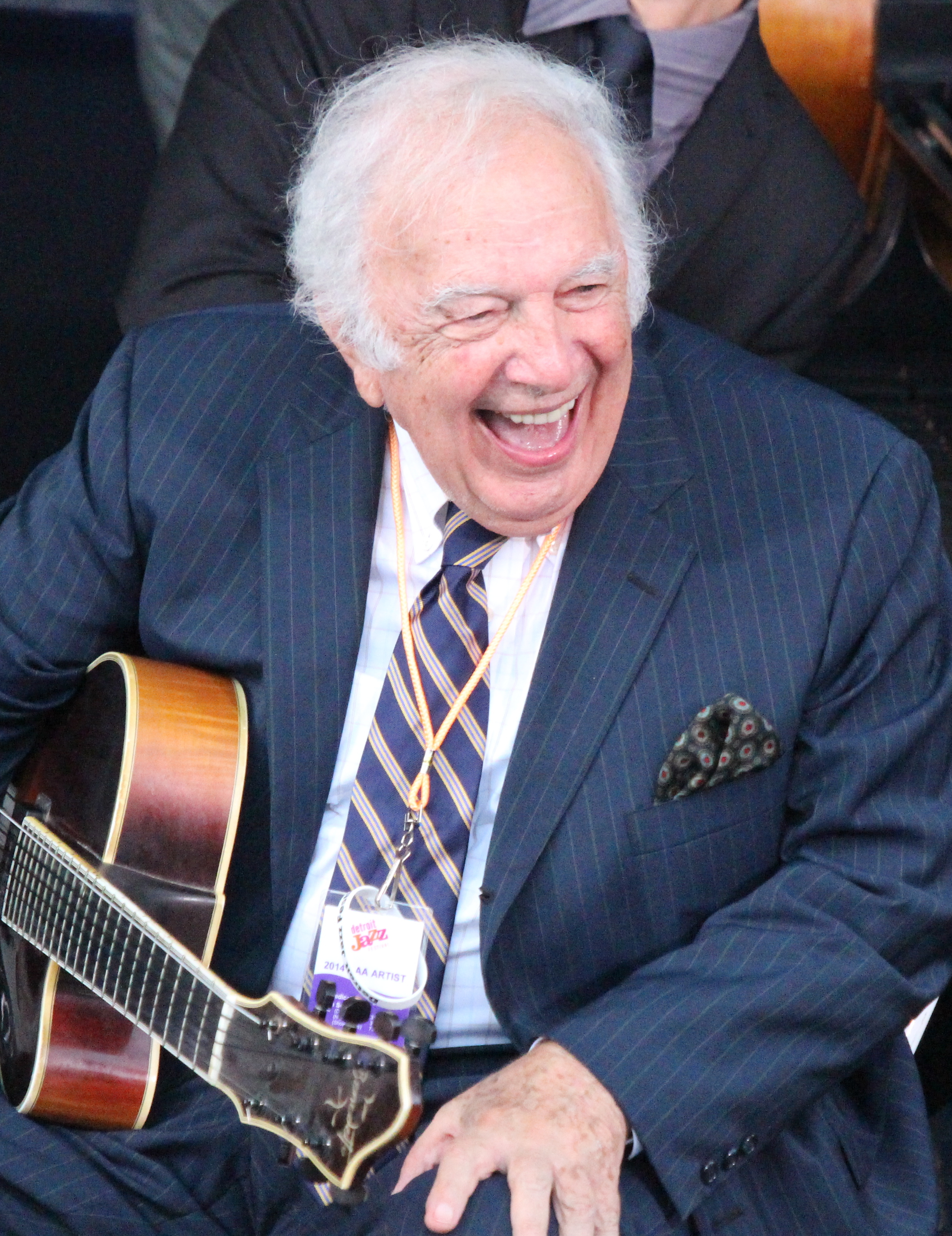
- Pizzarelli at the 2014 Detroit Jazz Festival

Background information
- Born: John Paul Pizzarelli; January 9, 1926; Paterson, New Jersey, U.S.
- Died: April 1, 2020 (aged 94) Saddle River, New Jersey, U.S.
- Genres: Jazz, swing, big band
- Occupation: Musician
- Instrument: Guitar
- Years active: 1950–2018
- Labels: Savoy, Stash, Arbors, Victoria, Chesky

John Paul "Bucky" Pizzarelli (January 9, 1926 – April 1, 2020) was an American jazz guitarist.

He worked for NBC as a staffman from 1964, including for Dick Cavett (1971) and ABC with Bobby Rosengarden in (1952). Musicians he collaborated with include Benny Goodman, George Barnes, Les Paul, Oscar Peterson, Stéphane Grappelli, Benny Green, and Antônio Carlos Jobim. Pizzarelli cited as influences Django Reinhardt, Freddie Green, and George Van Eps.

== Early life ==
Pizzarelli was born on January 9, 1926, in Paterson, New Jersey, United States. He learned to play guitar and banjo at a young age. His uncles, Pete and Bobby Domenick, were professional musicians, and sometimes the extended family would gather at one of their homes with their guitars for jam sessions. Pizzarelli cited blind accordion player Joe Mooney as an inspiration. Mooney led a quartet that included Pizzarelli's uncle, Bobby Domenick. During high school, Pizzarelli was the guitarist for a small band that performed classical music.

== Career ==
Pizzarelli began his professional career at 17 when he joined the Vaughn Monroe dance band in 1944.

In 1951, he did his first recording as a sideman outside the Monroe orchestra with Joe Mooney. In 1952, Pizzarelli became a staff musician for NBC, playing with Skitch Henderson. In 1964, he became a member of The Tonight Show Band on The Tonight Show Starring Johnny Carson. During his time spent performing for the Tonight Show, he accompanied guest bands and musicians playing through a variety of musical genres, including playing with Tiny Tim (after tuning the performer's ukulele) on the day that Tiny Tim married Miss Vicki on Carson's show.

From 1956 to 1957, Pizzarelli used the stage name "Johnny Buck" and performed with The Three Suns pop music trio. During the following year, he and guitarist George Barnes formed a duo and recorded two albums, including a live performance in August 1971, at The Town Hall in New York City. Beginning in the 1970s, he began recording as a leader, issuing many tributes to musicians of the 1930s. He toured several times with Benny Goodman until Goodman's death in 1986. He performed with Benny Goodman at the White House in Washington, D.C., and he performed for presidents Ronald Reagan, Bill Clinton, and First Lady Pat Nixon.

"Jersey Jazz Guitars" was the name of a 1985 concert held at the Rutgers University Nicholas Music Center in New Brunswick, New Jersey. The ticket featured Pizzarelli, Les Paul, Tal Farlow, and Pizzarelli's son, John. The concert was aired on New Jersey's public radio station as part of their three-part New Jersey Summerfare Series. Pizzarelli and Les Paul had performed together before, as they were neighbors and friends. The show aired for one hour in August 1985, with son John adding his vocals on two selections.

Pizzarelli continued to play into his 90s, making several appearances even after a stroke in 2016, officially retiring after a final brief appearance with Michael Feinstein in 2018. He died of COVID-19 on April 1, 2020, in Saddle River, New Jersey. He had been battling several serious health problems in recent years.

=== Guitars ===
Pizzarelli's first guitar was an archtop Gibson, an expensive instrument at the time. Since his first professional assignment with Vaughn Monroe, he favoured 1930s and 1940s Epiphone DeLuxe models and used them throughout his career for six-string, rhythm guitar work – as notably heard on his 2007 record Five for Freddie: Bucky Pizzarelli's Tribute To Freddie Green. Inspired by George Van Eps, in 1969 he started playing the seven-string guitar. In later years he owned and used a vast range of guitars but was mostly seen playing a Benedetto Bucky Pizzarelli Signature made by Robert Benedetto, who also makes guitars for Howard Alden and Frank Vignola. The extra string on Pizzarelli's guitar provided him with a bass line during performances. Pizzarelli also played a custom seven-string American archtop guitar made by luthier Dale Unger, who also makes custom guitars for Pizzarelli's partner, Ed Laub.

== Collaborations ==
With Anita Baker

- Rhythm of Love (Elektra, 1994)

With Tony Bennett

- To My Wonderful One (Columbia, 1960)
- I Wanna Be Around... (Columbia, 1963)
- I've Gotta Be Me (Columbia, 1969)

With Teresa Brewer

- Singin' A Doo-Dah Song (Flying Dutchman, 1972)
- We Love You Fats (Doctor Jazz, 1978)
- I Dig Big Band Singer (Doctor Jazz, 1984)
- Midnight Cafe (A Few More For the Road) (Doctor Jazz, 1986)

With Solomon Burke

- Solomon Burke (Apollo, 1962)

With Betty Carter

- 'Round Midnight (Atco, 1963)

With Petula Clark

- Warm and Tender (Warner Bros., 1971)

With Rosemary Clooney

- Do You Miss New York? (Concord, 1993)

With Judy Collins

- True Stories and Other Dreams (Elektra, 1973)

With Bill Danoff

- Reincarnation (ABC, 1969)

With Dion DiMucci

- Runaround Sue (Laurie, 1961)

With Roberta Flack

- First Take (Atlantic, 1969)

With Aretha Franklin

- The Electrifying Aretha Franklin (Columbia, 1962)
- The Tender, the Moving, the Swinging Aretha Franklin (Columbia, 1962)

With Michael Franks

- Tiger in the Rain (Warner Bros., 1979)

With The Free Design

- You Could Be Born Again (Project 3, 1968)

With Henry Gross

- Release (Lifesong, 1976)

With Janis Ian

- Aftertones (Columbia, 1975)

With Paul McCartney

- Kisses on the Bottom (Hear Music, 2012)

With Helen Merrill

- Casa Forte (Trio, 1980)

With Jane Monheit

- Never Never Land (N-Coded, 2000)

With Laura Nyro

- More Than a New Discovery (Verve, 1967)

With Robert Palmer

- Ridin' High (EMI, 1992)

With Lou Rawls

- Shades of Blue (Philadelphia, 1981)

With Neil Sedaka

- A Song (Elektra, 1977)

With Carly Simon

- Hotcakes (Elektra, 1974)

With Frank Sinatra

- The World We Knew (Reprise, 1967)
- Cycles (Reprise, 1968)
- She Shot Me Down (Reprise, 1981)

With Carrie Smith

- Every Now and Then (Silver Shadow, 1994)

With Sarah Vaughan

- The Duke Ellington Songbook, Vol. 1 (Pablo, 1980)
- The Duke Ellington Songbook, Vol. 2 (Pablo, 1980)

With Loudon Wainwright III

- Loudon Wainwright III (Atlantic, 1970)

== Personal life and death ==
Pizzarelli married Ruth (née Litchult) in 1954. His son John is a jazz guitarist and vocalist and his son Martin is a professional bassist who has recorded with his father and brother. His daughter Mary is a classical guitarist who appeared on her father's third album as a leader, Green Guitar Blues, as well as on other recordings. Pizzarelli also appeared on three albums of his daughter-in-law (John's wife), Jessica Molaskey. He died on April 1, 2020, from complications of COVID-19.

== Awards and honors ==
- Lifetime Achievement Award, MAC Awards, 2002
- Jazz Wall of Fame, ASCAP, 2005
- New Jersey Hall of Fame, 2011
