= Tomiyama Taeko =

Japanese artist (1921–2021)

- 富山妙子
- Born: November 6, 1921; Kobe, Hyogo Prefecture, Japan
- Died: August 18, 2021 (aged 99); Tokyo, Japan
- Occupations: visual artist, writer, journalist, illustrator
- Years active: 1953–2021
- Known for: slideshows, books, and artworks addressing Japanese imperialism and feminist issues
- Notable work: Prayer in Memory ～ Gwangju, May 1980; Memories of the Sea; Harbin: Requiem for the Twentieth Century

Tomiyama Taeko (富山妙子, 6 November 1921 – 18 August 2021) was a Japanese visual artist and writer whose work addressed the moral, emotional, and social issues related to nationalist, patriarchal, colonial, and post-colonial power structures in East Asia. Tomiyama used popular media such as oil painting, lithographic prints, collages, multimedia slideshows, books, and installations to explore marginalized figures. From the 1980s on, much of her work drew on indigenous Asian mythology, symbols, and aesthetics as a critique and rejection of the violent, exploitative, Euro-American-centric values embedded in modernist thinking. She was a devoted feminist, leftist, and anti-nationalist whose work told the stories of miners, ethnic minorities, comfort women, Minjung activists, and other marginalized groups to advocate for a reckoning with the nuances of colonial and imperial histories of Japan in Asia. Tomiyama died in August 2021, at the age of 99.

== Life ==
=== Early life ===
Tomiyama was born in Kobe, Hyōgo Prefecture, Japan, in November 1921. She spent her youth in Dairen and Harbin in Manchukuo. After graduating from the Harbin Girls' School in 1938, Tomiyama entered the Joshibi Women's School of Art and Design (now Joshibi University of Art and Design) in Tokyo in 1939. While at Joshibi, however, she became interested in proletarian art and ended up being expelled because of the incompatibility of her interests with the institution as the Pacific War heated up. Still, she ends up attending the Arts and Crafts Institute (Bijutsu Kōgei Gakuin) headed by critic Usaburō Toyama where she learned about Dada, the Bauhaus, and Surrealism under painter Ichirō Fukuzawa, among others.

=== 1950s ===
By the early 1950s, Tomiyama was a single mother to two children born to different fathers during the war. To support them, she worked as a freelance illustrator and journalist, often illustrating picture books. As a journalist, she traveled throughout Japan and internationally starting in the 1950s, and during her travels she came to use her art to express the social and political problems in the areas she visited, giving a voice to marginalized groups. Her first formal artistic production after dropping out of Joshibi was inspired by the mining landscapes of the Chikuho mining region in Kyushu where she was sent to cover the lives and labor organizing of miners in the early 1950s. Her first solo exhibition, held at Shiseido Gallery in Ginza in 1954, featured oil paintings of these mining landscapes. From the mid-1950s, however, her work shifted to lithographic prints that featured miners rather than landscapes. She later returned to the topic of mines in the 1980s in a series of lithographs treating the theme of Korean forced to work in hard labor conditions—mines, construction, and factories—during WWII.

=== 1960s ===
During the 1960s, Tomiyama had the opportunity to travel widely outside Japan, visiting Africa, Latin America, Central Asia, and the Middle East. Over the following decades she eventually traveled through Western and Eastern Europe, the Soviet Union, Southeast Asia, the United States, Taiwan, and in the 1990s, to return to Chinese Manchuria where she had lived until the end of her teenage years. During these early 1960s travels, however, she already began to establish a transnational network of activists involved in labor union organizing, peace advocacy, and social justice movements for herself, confirming her leftist commitments. In 1961 she followed Japanese miners who relocated to Brazil, but became curious about other walks of life in the regions, so she continued traveling throughout Latin America over the next year. During this trip she came to recognize the ongoing effects of Western colonial histories on contemporary politics and social problems. She gradually came to see how Japan's allyship with the United States replicated regional power relations during Japan's colonial era, with benefiting economically from pro-Japan US trade policies in East and Southeast Asia. This awareness led Tomiyama to leave the Japanese Communist Party, which she had joined after WWII, in protest of the party's acceptance of the Treaty on Basic Relations between Japan and the Republic of Korea (Nikkan Kihon Jōyaku) in 1965. In 1967, inspired by the populist aesthetics and indigenous references she saw in the works of Mexican muralist—Diego Rivera, David Alfaro Siqueiros, and José Clemente Orozco—during her Latin American trip, Tomiyama set off for Turkey, Syria, Iraq, Iran, Afghanistan, and India. Although she sought a people's art and developed an Asian-inspired artistic language distinct from the formal Japanese academic training she received in Tokyo, she found herself increasingly doubting the values of modern civilization. Returning to Japan in 1968 amidst the height of the student protests, she temporarily shifted away from painting to focus on activism.

=== 1970s ===
Just as Japan was taking the international spotlight through Osaka's Expo '70, Tomiyama headed off to Seoul in 1970. There she found South Korea still scarred by Korean War, and after visiting political prisoner Suh Sung in 1971, she was again inspired to take up black-and-white printmaking, now in service of the Korean pro-democracy movement. She began reading the poems of Kim Chi-ha, and when he and student activists from Seoul University were rounded up and sentenced to death in 1974, she produced lithographs to serve as backdrops for a Japanese television documentary on Kim's plight. When the documentary was censored, however, Tomiyama established Hidane Kōbō (Kindling Atelier) in 1976 to embark on independent production of multi-media slide works. Through these slide works, which combine images with music and poetry, she has produced works featuring Japanese translations of poems by Kim Chi-ha and Chit Phumisak, and collaborated with such figures as musician Yūji Takahashi, photographer and director Seiichi Motohashi, and actor Soichi Itō. In May 1980 her slide show Prayer in Memory: Gwangju, May, 1980, featuring music by Takahashi, addressed the violent crackdown by dictator Chung Doo-Hwan's military on the pro-democracy Gwangju uprising and won her international recognition. In more recent years, select slide shows have become DVDs as well,

Tomiyama also became involved in the feminist movement in the 1970s. Inspired by the writings of Shulamith Firestone, Kate Millet, and other Japanese feminists, she edited a volume of feminist essays by thirteen women writers in 1973. Also in 1973, Tomiyama joined the anti-kisaeng sex tour movement, which sought to both raise awareness of and curb the growing sex tourism industry that saw newly-affluent Japanese men of the post-economic-miracle 1970s going on sex tours in South Korea, the Philippines, and Thailand. A group of women including Tomiyama, journalist Yayori Matsui, Akiko Yamaguchi, and others involved in the anti-kisaeng sex tour movement went on to establish the Asian Women's Association (Aija no Onnatachi no kai) in 1977. Through activist actions and the journal Asian Women's Liberation (Ajia to josei kaihō), the AWA sought to respond "to the voices of Korean and other Asian women," and in "'learning' from them, these Japanese women activists also formed a solidarity movement dealing with such issues as human rights, labor rights, and the colonial past, all of which were pertinent to East and Southeast Asian women."

Tomiyama extended these interests in postcolonialist activism to the art world through her activities with the Japan Afro-Asian Latin American Artists' Association (JAALA). She was a founding member of the group in 1977, and served as one of the two first vice-chairmen. JAALA, which continues today, focuses on building solidarity between Japan and "the Third World" through artistic exchange in order destroy "the limits of the modern art," inspire a "cultural revolution," and thus "create new human [sic], new art based on the new sense of values." The group thus aligns with Tomiyama's concern with finding a way out of the modernist paradigm and its privileging of Western cultural values as universal while recognizing Japan's historical complicity in reinforcing modernist social, cultural, and political structures.

=== 1980s~90s ===
Historian Laura Hein argues that it is Tomiyama's encounter with feminism that inspired her to incorporate experiences from her past growing up in Dairen and Harbin into her work in the 1980s, exploring the links between personal identity, nation state, racial and gender hierarchies, and colonial power structures. This personal exploration coincided with increasing focus by the AWA on the issue of comfort women, a topic that combined Tomiyama's feminist interests with her desire to confront Japan's colonial legacies in Asia. Borrowing a term from art historian and critic Hiroki Yamamoto, cultural anthropologist Yuko Manabe describes this field of investigation as the "intersection of post-colonialism and feminism." It is in this context that Tomiyama reintroduced color into her work and began to draw more explicitly on imagery and aesthetics drawn from Asian folk religions, including motifs of the shaman, the fox, Southeast Asian and Pacific Island masks and puppets, dragons, and celestial symbols from the 1980s on.

Tomiyama's most prominent works of the 1980s and 90s, A Memory of the Sea, Harbin: Requiem for the Twentieth Century, and The Fox Story, were dedicated to the victims of Japanese imperialism, in particular Koreans, including women sexually exploited by the Japanese military known as comfort women. As a result, her work has been sidelined by most art institutions in Japan and ignored by the Japanese media. In spite of these institutional challenges, however, Tomiyama found success in a fine arts context in 1995 with her traveling solo exhibition Silenced by History: Tomiyama Taeko, 50 Years after the War at the Tama Art University Museum in Tokyo and Donga Gallery in Seoul and the invitation to show her work in the Art as Witness project for the first Gwangju Biennale. Still, the majority of her exhibitions over the last four decades of her life were held in university art galleries, municipal galleries and lobbies, and human rights organizations.

=== 2000–2021 ===
During the final two decades of Tomiyama's life, she continued to address Japan's complicity in a world order established by Western colonialism and a post-WWII US-led geopolitics through projects such as Hiruko and the Puppeteers: A Tale of Sea Wanderers and Revelation from the Sea. Yet in spite of her continued production during these years, much of her exhibition activity was more concerned with contextualizing her new works alongside her early work and developing a clearer view of her legacy as an artist. Her work was featured in the seminal feminist exhibition Japanese Women Artists in Avant-garde Movements, 1950–1975 curated by Reiko Kokatsu for the Tochigi Prefectural Museum of Art in 2005, and a major exhibition exploring the limits of freedom of expression in East Asian democracies at the Neue Gesellschaft für Bildende Kunst in Berlin in 2015. Two major retrospectives of her work—a 2005 traveling exhibition titled Remembrance and Reconciliation shown at Ruhr University in Bochum, Philadelphia's International House, and Northwestern University's Dittmar Gallery and a special exhibition curated by Kitagawa Fram as part of the 2009 Echigo-Tsumari Triennial—helped to confirm the importance of her work despite her marginalization within the institutional art world. After finding it challenging for students and other audiences to grasp the full scope of Tomiyama's work during the 2005 exhibition, Northwestern University historian Laura Hein and Professor Emerita of Kyoto Seika University Rebecca Jennison launched a website and book in 2010 to better contextualize Tomiyama's practice. In 2018 a research team headed by University of Tokyo cultural anthropologist Yuko Manabe embarked on an investigation of Tomiyama's life and work, resulting in a number of new articles about her work and contributing to a retrospective of Tomiyama's work at Yonsei University Museum held from March to August 2021. The exhibition was launched with a virtual symposium on her life and work co-hosted by Yonsei University and University of Tokyo, and during the exhibition's run, in June 2021, Tomiyama was awarded South Korea's Order of Civil Merit for her contributions to the country's democratization process. Tomiyama died on August 18, 2021, at her home in Tokyo at the age of 99.

== Select Artwork Series ==
=== Mining and Miners ===
Tomiyama's earliest works of the postwar period were focused on the coal and copper mines in Hokkaido and Kyūshu, a site of major social inequality, energy production for postwar reconstruction, and labor union organizing in the 1950s. The first series she produced in these hinterlands were mining landscapes rendered in a cubist style that sought to capture the beauty of discarded and devalued subjects, but in producing these oil paintings, she confirmed her dissatisfaction with the two dominant modes of painting in early postwar Japan, namely Socialist realism and the European modernist avant garde. She then switched to the medium of lithographic prints, rendered in black and white to capture the visages of the miners she met. While the reportage-like aspect of addressing the inhabitants rather than the landscapes appealed to her, she feared her expressionistic style bore too much resemblance to that of one of her sources of inspiration, Käthe Kollwitz. Thus she continued her search for a language distinct from European modernism that could authentically address the lives of everyday and marginalized people.

=== Chained Hands in Prayer: Korea ===
Tomiyama produced a series of black-and-white lithographic prints based on Kim Chi-ha's poetry in 1974 as a response to the arrest and death sentences imposed on Kim and group of pro-democracy students at Seoul University. Although produced in part for the publication Shin'ya: Kimu Jiha + Tomiyama Taeko shigashū (Midnight: Kim Chi Ha + Tomiyama Taeko Illustrated Poetry Collection), several works from this series were to be used as backdrops for fifteen-minute television documentary called "Kim Chi Ha: A Christian in Darkness" scheduled to precede Kim's trial in 1976. When NHK canceled the broadcast, however, Tomiyama and the documentary crew turned the show into a slideshow called Chained Hands in Prayer: Korea 1974. Featuring 140 slides of Tomiyama's lithographs alongside a musical score by musician Yūji Takahashi, the slideshow toured churches and other public venues in countries around the world including the US, Mexico, and South Korea. Art historian Hagiwara Hiroko argues that as a politically committed artist resigned to working outside of commercial galleries and other central art institutions, this slide show format became Tomiyama's signature medium, solving the problem of reaching audiences through its portable, easily reproducible format.

=== Prayer in Memory ～ Gwangju, May 1980 ===
Tomiyama considers this primarily black-and-white (though including limited color now) lithographic series crucial in her development as an artist. Tomiyama and Takahashi were inspired to produce prints and music in the immediate aftermath of the May 1980 uprising in Gwangju, initially intended to be used in a television documentary, but upon learning the broadcast was to be cancelled, they turned them into another slideshow work. As with the 1977 slideshow, Prayer in Memory ~ Gwangju, May 1980 traveled across the US, Europe, and South Korea at events hosted by human rights groups in churches, universities, and other public gathering spaces. Her response to the Gwangju massacre was one of the first to circulate internationally, thanks to her unique long-term commitment to the Korean pro-democracy movement and her privileged position working as an artist based outside of Korea.

=== Coerced and Forlorn ===
This series, completed in 1984, saw Tomiyama return to the theme of miners, but this time through the topic of Japan's wartime policies of forced labor by Korean ethnic minorities. While still produced as lithographic prints, art historian Hiroko Hagiwara writes that Tomiyama "first draw and carved the images, then printed and cut them out so that she could construct collages." Rather than depicting the violence of forced migration and slave labor, Tomiyama uses bold graphic forms cut and arranged irregularly to depict the social and psychological effects of these policies, and to reflect on the complicity of Japanese civilians in this imperial history. Hagiwara argues that with this series Tomiyama's "signature theme had become imperial rule, for which she thought she bore responsibility as a Japanese person."

=== Memories of the Sea ===
By the mid-1980s Tomiyama had found a radically new approach to her chosen subject of the lingering legacies of Japan's colonial rule. She returned to oil painting for the first time since the 1950s and introduced full color into these new compositions while incorporating references to Asian folk religions and tales as her new "Asian visual language." She first took up this new approach in a 1983 work that preceded this series entitled Those who fly in the sky. Inspired by Lady Dai's Funerary Banner, a Han dynasty work discovered at the Mawangdi Tomb in the mid-1970s, the image incorporates the color palette of the ancient banner and includes a pantheon of mythological creatures inspired by the cosmological symbols in the original banner, but with a feminist twist. Instead of placing the male mythological figure of Fu Xi in the heavens as the penultimate motif in the overall composition, Tomiyama's painting focuses on the earthly realm and replaces the death rituals of Lady Dai with an image of a traditional standing birth, thematizing a scene of feminine strength.

Memories of the Sea (1986) continued this mixture of Japanese and foreign non-Western sources, combining the macabre aesthetics of medieval Japanese hungry ghost scrolls and Kawanabe Kyōsai prints with Mexican Day of the Dead motifs from artists including José Guadalupe Posada. Centering on the image of the female shaman as an indigenous tradition common across Central and East Asia, but one particularly poignant for Koreans seeking to heal from the death and trauma of colonial rule, the series deals with the debt the Japanese owe to the women conscripted as comfort women during the Pacific Theater of WWII. The slide show version of this series (completed in 1988) opens with the line "I am a shaman, I am a Miko," and the series focuses on scenes that invoke shrines, graveyards, and other memorials alongside symbols of Japanese imperialism and allusions to the consumption of human female figures. Unlike earlier series, Memories of the Sea included a performance as well as the painting series and slide show, foregrounding the seemingly futile attempt to give voices to the comfort women victims whose stories were lost to the war and the seas through the figure of the shaman who bridges the worlds of the living and the dead. Completed before the death of the Showa Emperor and the subsequent public testimonies of comfort women from various countries, the international tours of this series helped establish a groundwork for the 1990s activism around Japanese war responsibility. Tomiyama continued this theme of women victims of Japanese Imperialism into the early 1990s, connecting the plight of comfort women during the war to that of Korean and Southeast Asian women brought to Japan as sex workers in the decades following the 1960s Japanese economic miracle. These themes were realized in painting series such as the slideshow Kaeranu onnatachi (Women Who Do Not Return) and the painting series Nihon ni ikō! (Let's go to Japan!) both of 1991.

=== Harbin: Requiem for the Twentieth Century and The Fox Story ===
These series, completed in the 1990s and early 2000s, introduced the figure of the fox into Tomiyama's oeuvre. Tomiyama's fox figures draw on Asian folk mythology that sees the fox as a trickster, disguising itself as an innocent human only to betray those who trust it, and at the same time as a figure that most often takes the form of a woman to convincingly play the role of innocent victim. As scholar of religion Yuki Miyamoto explains, Tomiyama's fox imagery invokes ethical questions, "not only rais[ing] the question of whether women were victims of war and patriarchal society, but also the question of whether they were complicit in the structure of war."[82] As Miyamoto further points out, the complexity of this figure includes its association with war through the destructive image of kitsunebi (foxfire), its appearance across cultural and religious boundaries (most explicitly in the figure of the Shinto/Buddhist deity Inari in Japan), and its association with the Japanese imperial household through the enthronement ceremony for new emperors.

Harbin: Requiem for the Twentieth Century (1995) was Tomiyama's response to her childhood growing up in Manchuria as a settler colonist, inspired by a 1992 trip to the region and completed for the fiftieth anniversary of the end of WWII. Realized as series of forty paintings, collages, and silkscreen prints organized into eight groups, this series uses the multi-cultural history of modern as a stage through which to explore the complex power relations of the Japanese empire's colonial margins. In one group of seven paintings depicting everyday Japanese as foxes, Tomiyama reflects on the hierarchies that allowed a female Japanese citizen such as herself to both wield colonial privilege, be viewed as second-class colonizers by the Westerner's gaze, and be victim of the patriarchal structures of Japanese imperial society. Silkscreen works in the Harbin series, such as Sold off to the Continent and Karayuki (both 1994), continue her previous theme of comfort women and human trafficking. A group of photocollages from the series titled Harbin Station: the Chronicle treats historical incidents such as the Boxer Rebellion and the assassination of Itō Hirobumi by Ahn Jung-geun. A Fox Story (1999) treats the theme of the Japanese colonization of Manchuria in a less personal, more folkloric way, following ritual cycles of daily life against a wartime backdrop before connecting them to the bustle and affluence of contemporary corporate Japan.

Both series combine symbols of modern imperial rule and sacrifice for the empire, such as cherry blossoms, hinomaru flags, and chrysanthemums with landscapes of the continental colony and tableau associated with travel and conquest: a fox family posing for a photo in front a shrine before sending a groom-soldier off to war, a procession of foxes wind through a cherry-blossom-laced landscape toting banners with wartime slogans, a faceless soldier seemingly encountering a red-light district complete with a bevy of geisha in front of a desolate sunset. This idea of travel further carries through to her treatment of many of the paintings in the Harbin series, which she mounted on inherited antique cloth replicating the conventions of East Asian hanging scrolls and handscrolls in a nod toward portability. As with Tomiyama's other major painting series, both Harbin: Requiem for the Twentieth Century and The Fox Story were turned into slideshows, using photographic details of the paintings to turn a handful of paintings each into longer narratives. When it was exhibited in a gallery space for Silenced by History in 1995, the Harbin painting series ended in a dimly lit multi-media installation featuring a gas-mask-wearing soldier and strewn broken testtubes that referenced the medical experiments conducted by the Japanese on prisoners near Harbin.

=== Hiruko and the Puppeteers: A Tale of Sea Wanderers ===
As implied by the title of the 2007–09 Hiruko and the Puppeteers: A Tale of Sea Wanderers, this series of paintings and collages follow a troupe of Polynesian masks, Japanese folkloric dolls, and Malaysian and Indonesian puppets on a journey to Southeast Asia from Central Asia via China and Awaji Island. While the collages set photographs of dolls and prints of deities against more abstract designs evocative of water and mud, the paintings are explicitly set under the sea in the depths of greenish waters. The narrative this series follows focuses on these masks, puppets, and dolls as signifiers of deities cast aside in the materialistic frenzy of modern culture in the twentieth century as humans turned to cinema, animations, and other technological entertainments. Yet the series is also concerned with the lingering effects of the Cold War geopolitical order in the form of the 9/11 attacks, the violent attempts of the Western powers to maintain control over oil-laced deserts, and the Japanese and Korean complicity with the military policies of the US in Asia. The series thus continues Tomiyama's "longstanding focus on transnational history, warfare, and Japan's relationship with Asia."

=== Revelation from the Sea ===
Initiated in the aftermath of the triple tragedies of the Tohoku Earthquake, tsunami, and nuclear meltdown of 3.11, Revelation from the Sea treats the invisible threats from these events and the subsequent bungling of the Japanese corporate and government responses in four paintings and fourteen collages. With themes such as the exploded remains of Reactor No. 4, Caesium-137-laced cherry blossoms, a menacingly red sunset over a deceptively calm sea, dead butterflies, disassembled circuit boards, and fires within tsunami-flooded urban ruins, the series reads as an apocalyptic critique of the modern hubris that is intertwined with contemporary energy networks and electronic technologies. Given this focus on death, it is not surprising that this is also the first series of Tomiyama's to prominently feature Buddhist deities—Fūjin, Raijin, and the Shitennō—although following her earlier strategies of featuring cross-cultural figures, these deities have their roots in Hindu iconography. She collaborated again with Yūji Takahashi to turn this series into a multimedia show, but this time in the form of a DVD rather than a slideshow.

== Select exhibitions ==
- Solo exhibition, Shiseido Gallery, Ginza, Tokyo, 1954
- Exhibitions of lithographs from the On the Poems of Kim Ji-ha and Pablo Neruda series, New York, Chicago, and Berkeley, 1975
- Exhibitions of Kwangju, May 1980: A Prayer in Memory, Kansai and Sapporo, Japan, 1980
- Exhibitions held in Paris, Berlin, Heidelberg and Munich, 1982–83
- Exhibition of oil paintings, prints, movie, and slide show, Gallery of the University of London, UK, 1988
- War as Seen through Women's Eyes, Galerie NIL, West Berlin, West Germany, 1988
- Tomiyama Taeko hanga-ten: waga Chikuhō, waga Chōsen, Liberty Osaka (Osaka Human Rights Museum), 1989
- Two-person exhibition with Jaratsuri Roopkumdee, Bangkok, Thailand, 1991
- Erōsu, waga itami: Tomiyama Taeko-ten, Parthenon Tama Municipal Gallery, Tama City, Tokyo, Japan in conjunction with the Tama Feminist Festival, 1992
- Ajia e no shiza: kaeranu shojo genga-ten, the Japan Foundation ASEAN Cultural Center Gallery, Tokyo, 1993
- Special Guest Exhibition, First Gwangju Biennal Art Festival, Gwangju, Korea, 1995
- Silenced by History: Tomiyama Taeko, 50 Years after the War, Tama Art University Museum, Tokyo and Donga Gallery, Seoul, 1995
- Ianfu e no rekuiemu: Tomiyama Taeko sakuhin-ten, Liberty Osaka (Osaka Human Rights Museum), 1997
- From the Asians: Tomiyama Taeko & Hong Sung-dam, Mangwol-dong Gallery, Gwangju; Bucheon City Hall Lobby, Korea; and Kawasaki City Education and Culture Center, Japan, 1998
- 3rd Gwangju Biennale, Korea, 2000
- Kitsune to tankō-ten, Acros Fukuoka, Kyushu, Japan, 2001
- Miko to Kitsune: Tomiyama Taeko, Gallery Fleur, Kyoto Seika University, 2002
- Japanese Women Artists in Avant-garde Movements, 1950–1975, curated by Kokatsu Reiko, Tochigi Prefectural Museum of Fine Arts, Utsunomiya, Japan, 2005
- Remembrance and Reconciliation, Ruhr University, Bochum, Germany; International House, Philadelphia; Dittmar Gallery, Northwestern University, Chicago, USA, 2005–06
- Embracing Asia: The Complete Works of Tomiyama Taeko 1950–2009, Echigo-Tsumari Triennial, Nakasato, 2009
- Tomiyama Taeko sakuhin-ten: kioku no ito wo tumugu—shinsai, sensō, onna, Riaosha Gallery, Keio University, 2012
- Banned Images: Control and Censorship in East Asian Democracies, Neue Gesellschaft für Bildende Kunst, 2015
- Tomiyama Taeko: Owari no hajimari, hajimari no owari, Maruki Gallery for the Hiroshima Panels, Saitama, Japan, 2016–17 (special exhibition)
- Truth: Promise for Peace, National Women's History Exhibition Hall, Seoul, 2017
- 74th Annual Japan Independent Exhibition and Women Artists, Japan Art Association, National Art Center, Tokyo, 2021
- To Turbulent Seas of Memory: The World of Tomiyama Taeko, Yonsei University Museum, 2021 (included a symposium co-hosted by the Institute for Advanced Studies on Asia, University of Tokyo)

== Publications ==
- Tankōfu to watakushi, Mainichi Shinbunsha, 1960
- Chūnanbei hitori tabi, Asahi Shinbunsha, 1964
- Hankenryoku no shōgen: shimin ga tsuikyū suru, Gōdō Shuppan, 1971
- Watashi no kaihō: henkyō to teihen no tabi, Chikuma Shobō, Ltd., 1972
- Onna e no sanka: warera no kaihō, Sanseidō Co., Ltd., 1973
- Koe yo kesareta koe yo Chiri ni [Silenced Voices: Chile], Rironsha Co., Ltd., 1974 (poetry by Pablo Neruda and Gabriela Mistral, lithographs by Tomiyama Takeo)
- Watashi no girishia shinwa: erōsu e no kaiki, Doshinsha Publishing, 1975
- Shin'ya: Kimu Jiha + Tomiyama Taeko shigashū, Doyō Bijutsusha, 1976 (poetry by Kim Chi-ha, prints by Tomiyama Taeko)
- Kaihō no bigaku: 20-seiki no gaka wa nani o mezashita ka, Miraisha, 1979
- Hajike hōsenka: bi to sei e no toi, Chikuma Shobō, Ltd., 1983
- Souru—Pari—Tōkyō: e to minzoku wo meguru taidan, Kirokusha, 1985 (co-authors Lee Ungno, Park In-kyung, and Tomiyama Taeko)
- Sensō sekinin o uttaeru hitori tabi: Rondon, Berurin, Nyūyōku, Iwanami Shoten, 1989
- Minshū ga jidai o hiraku: minshū shingaku o meguru Nikkan no taiwa, Shinkyō Shuppansha, 1990
- Jidai o tsugeta onnatachi: nijisseiki feminizumu e no michi, Tsuge Shobō, 1990
- Kaeranu onnatachi: jūgun ianfu to Nihon bunka, Iwanami Shoten, 1992
- Bijutsushi o toki hanatsu, Jiji Tsūshinsha, 1994 (co-authors Tomiyama Taeko, Hamada Kazuko, and Hagiwara Hiroko)
- Silenced by History: Tomiyama Taeko's Work, Gendai Kikakushitsu, 1995
- Hiruko to kugutsushi: tabigeinin no monogatari [Hiruko and the puppeteers: A tale of sea wanderers], Gendai Kikakushitsu, 2009 (paintings by Tomiyama Taeko, music by Takahashi Yūji)
- Ajia o idaku: gaka jinsei kioku to yume, Iwanami Shoten, 2009
- Imagination without Borders: Feminist Artist Tomiyama Taeko and Social Responsibility, by Laura Hein and Rebecca Jemison, University of Michigan Press, 2010
- "Otokobunka" yo, saraba: shokuminchi, sensō, genpatsu o kataru, Iwanami Shoten, 2013 (Sug-ok Shin interviewer, Tomiyama Taeko interviewee)
- Banned Images: Control and Censorship in East Asian Democracies, Neue Gesellschaft für Bildende Kunst, 2015 (exhibition catalogue)

== Public collections ==
The British Museum, London

Asian Art Museum, San Francisco

Kyoto Seika University, Kyoto

Ha Jung-woong Collection, Gwangju Museum of Art
