= Stefano Gualeni =

Italian philosopher and game designer (born 1978)

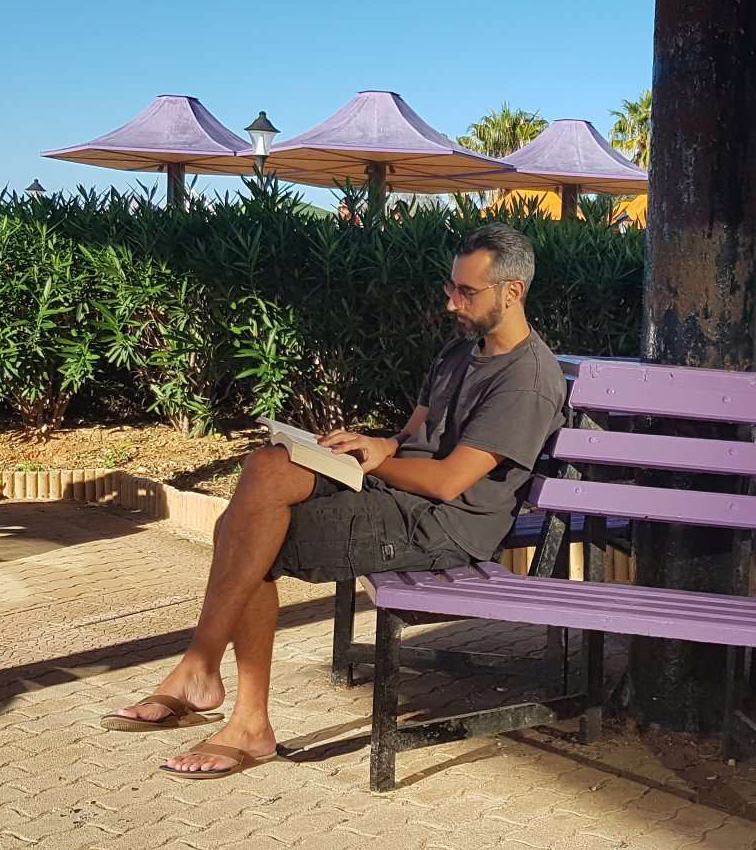
- Born: 30 April 1978 (age 48); Lovere, Italy
- Occupations: Philosopher, Video game designer, Professor

Education
- Education: Polytechnic University of Milan (MSc); Utrecht School of the Arts (MA); Erasmus University Rotterdam (PhD)

Philosophical work
- School: Philosophy and Literature; Existentialism; Philosophy of technology
- Institutions: University of Malta
- Main interests: Game studies; Game design; Speculative fiction; Science fiction; Fictional games
- Website: https://gua-le-ni.com

Stefano Gualeni (born 30 April 1978) is an Italian philosopher, professor, and game designer who has created video games such as Tony Tough and the Night of Roasted Moths, Gua-Le-Ni; or, The Horrendous Parade, and Something Something Soup Something.

Gualeni is currently a full professor at the Institute of Digital Games of the University of Malta, where he pursues academic research in the fields of game design, virtual worlds research, the philosophy of technology, science fiction, and existentialism.

He had been a visiting researcher in various international institutions, including the Laguna College of Art and Design of Laguna Beach, California (2015-2020), the Centre of the Digital Humanities of the University of Gothenburg, Sweden (2019), the Ritsumeikan Center for Game Studies (RCGS) at the Ritsumeikan University of Kyoto, Japan (2023), the Faculty of Media and Communication of the Singidunum University of Belgrade, Serbia (2024), and the Faculty of Philosophy of the University of Perugia, Italy (2026).

== Background ==
Stefano Gualeni was born in Lovere, Italy in 1978, Gualeni graduated in 2004 in architecture at the Politecnico di Milano. His final thesis was developed in Mexico and is supported by ITESM (Tec de Monterrey, Campus Ciudad de México).

Gualeni was awarded his Master of Arts in 2008 at the Utrecht School of the Arts. In his thesis, he proposed a model for digital aesthetics inspired by Martin Heidegger's existential phenomenology.

He obtained his PhD in Philosophy (in the fields of existentialism and philosophy of technology) at the Erasmus University Rotterdam in 2014. His dissertation, titled Augmented Ontologies, focuses on virtual worlds in their role as mediators: as interactive, artificial environments where philosophical ideas, world-views, and thought-experiments can be manipulated and communicated experientially.

== Academic work ==
Gualeni's work takes place in the intersection between continental philosophy and the design of virtual worlds. Given the practical and interdisciplinary focus of his research - and depending on the topics and the resources at hand - his output takes the form of academic texts, literary fictions, and/or of interactive digital experiences. In his articles and essays, he presents computers as instruments to prefigure and design ourselves and our worlds, and as gateways to experience alternative possibilities of being.

In 2015, Gualeni released the book Virtual Worlds as Philosophical Tools: How to Philosophize with a Digital Hammer with Palgrave Macmillan. Inspired by post-phenomenology and by Martin Heidegger's philosophy of technology, the book attempts to answer questions such as: will experiencing worlds that are not 'actual' change our ways of structuring thought? Can virtual worlds open up new possibilities to philosophize?

His 2020 book with Daniel Vella, Virtual Existentialism: Meaning and Subjectivity in Virtual Worlds, engages with the question of what it means to exist in virtual worlds. Drawing from the tradition of existentialism, it introduces the notion of 'virtual subjectivity' and discusses the experiential and existential mechanisms by which can move into, and out of, virtual subjectivities. It also includes chapters that specifically leverage the work of Helmuth Plessner, Peter W. Zapffe, Jean-Paul Sartre and Eugen Fink to think through the existential significance of the virtual.

His contributions to the edited volumes Experience Machines: Philosophy in Virtual Worlds, Towards a Philosophy of Digital Media, and Perspectives on the European Videogame similarly focus on the experiential and existential effects and possibilities disclosed by virtual technologies.

One of the central themes of Gualeni's work revolves around the fact that the history of philosophy has, until recently, merely been the history of written thought. He argues that we are, however, witnessing a technological shift in how philosophy is pursued, valued, and communicated. In that respect, Gualeni advances the claim that digital media can constitute an alternative and a complement to our almost-exclusively linguistic approach to developing and communicating thought. He considers virtual worlds to be philosophically viable and advantageous in contexts like thought experiments (where we can objectively test and evaluate possible courses of action and corresponding consequences), in the case of philosophical inquiries concerning non-actual state of affairs, and for speculative research into non-human phenomenologies.

== Bibliography ==
=== Monographic books (non-fiction) ===
- Gualeni, S. 2026. El Videojuego del Mundo: Instrucciones de Uso. Buenos Aires (Argentina): Adriana Hidalgo Editora.
- Gualeni, S. 2024. Il Videogioco del Mondo: Istruzioni per l'uso. Palermo (Italy): Time0.
- Gualeni, S. & Fassone, R. 2022. Fictional Games: A Philosophy of Worldbuilding and Imaginary Play. London (UK): Bloomsbury.
- Gualeni, S. & Vella, D. 2020. Virtual Existentialism: Meaning and Subjectivity in Virtual Worlds. Basingstoke (UK): Palgrave.
- Gualeni, S. 2015. Virtual Worlds as Philosophical Tools: How to Philosophize with a Digital Hammer. Basingstoke (UK): Palgrave MacMillan.

=== Novels (fiction) ===
- Gualeni, S. 2025. What We Owe the Dead. Eindhoven (NL): Set Margins'.
- Gualeni, S. 2023. The Clouds: An Experiment in Theory-Fiction. New York (NY): Routledge.

=== Edited volumes ===
- Ford, D.; Gualeni, S.; Van de Mosselaer, N.; Vella, D. 2026. Scholar's Codex. Dublin (Ireland): Tune & Fairweather.

=== Book chapters ===
- Gualeni, S. 2026. "A World Beyond our Understanding: Madman's Knowledge". In Ford, D., Gualeni, S., Van de Mosselaer, N. & Vella, D. (eds.) Scholar’s Codex. Dublin (Ireland): Tune & Fairweather, pp. 138-148.
- Sun, Y & Gualeni, S. 2025. "Between Puppet and Actor: Reframing Authorship in this Age of AI Agents", Nelson Zagalo & Damián Keller (eds.) In Artificial Media: Emerging Trends in Narratives, Education and Creative Practice. Cham (Switzerland): Springer Nature Switzerland, pp. 49–63.
- Gualeni, S. & Vella, D. 2023. "Desasosiego al Jugar, una Perspectiva Existencial", Marta Martín Núñez (ed.) Jugar el malestar. Ludonarrativas más allá de la diversión. Santander (Spain): Shangrila, pp. 14–21.
- Van de Mosselaer, N. & Gualeni, S. 2022. "Representing Imaginary Spaces: Fantasy, Fiction, and Virtuality". In Gottwald, D., Vahdat, V., Turner-Rahman, G. (eds.) Virtual Interiorities. Pittsburgh (PA): ETC Press, Vol. 3, pp. 21–44.
- Gualeni, S. & Vella, D. 2021. "Existential Ludology and Peter Wessel Zapffe". In Navarro-Remesal, V. & Pérez-Latorre O. (eds.) Perspectives on the European Videogame. Amsterdam (The Netherlands): Amsterdam University Press, pp. 175–192.
- Gualeni, S. 2019. "Virtual World-Weariness: On Delaying the Experiential Erosion of Digital Environments". In Gerber, A. and Goetz, U. (eds.) The Architectonics of Game Spaces: The Spatial Logic of the Virtual and its Meaning for the Real. Bielefeld (Germany): Transcript, pp. 153–165.
- Gualeni, S. 2018. "A Philosophy of 'DOING' in the digital". In Romele, A. and Terrone, E. (eds.), Towards a Philosophy of Digital Media. Basingstoke (UK): Palgrave Macmillan, pp. 225–255.
- Gualeni, S. 2017. "VIRTUAL WELTSCHMERZ: Things to keep in mind while building experience machines and other tragic technologies". In Silcox, M. (ed.), Experience Machines: The Philosophy of Virtual Worlds. London (UK): Rowman and Littlefield International, pp. 113–136.
- Gualeni, S. 2015. "Playing with Puzzling Philosophical Problems". In Zagalo, N. and Branco, P. (eds.). Creativity in the Digital Age. Springer Series on Cultural Computing, XIV. London (UK): Springer-Verlag, pp. 59–74.

== Ludography ==
=== Playable academic works ===
Stefano is a philosopher who designs games videogames and a game designer who is passionate about philosophy. Although his academic work largely takes the form of texts, he also designs virtual experiences that have the specific objective of disclosing thought experiments and ideas in ways that are interactive and negotiable (and perhaps even playful).

The following are part of his ongoing 'playable philosophy' project:

- HAMM-3R (2026): a short, experimental shooter videogame about how our equipment influences the ways we understand the world and act within it.
- Doors (the game) (2021): a weird, postmodern point and click adventure video game about how objects (and doors in particular) are represented within videogames
- "HERE" (2018): a mock-JRPG playfully invites to reflect on how many types of 'here' co-exist in a virtual world
- Something Something Soup Something (2017): a short first-person adventure video game about analytical definitions and family resemblances
- Necessary Evil (2013): a self-reflexive game about the centrality of player-experience in video game design

Other playable academic works:

- Construction BOOM! (2020): a strategic two-player tile-laying game meant as a satirical take on the unrestrained residential construction in Malta. The game was a finalist for SaltCON's 2021 Ion Award in the Strategy Category.
- CURIO (2021): a free, playful toolkit for primary school students to be used in class, part of a 3-year research project funded by the Erasmus+ program

=== Commercial titles released as game designer ===
- Gua-Le-Ni; or, The Horrendous Parade (2011) (iPad)
- Prezzemolo in una Giornata da Incubo (2007) (DVD TV game)
- Tony Tough 2: A Rake's Progress (2006) (PC)
- Midway Classics 2 (2006) (GBA)
- Midway Classics 1 (2006) (GBA)
- Dangerous Heaven (2005) (DVD TV game)
- Prezzemolo in una Giornata da Incubo (2003) (PC)
- Tony Tough and the Night of Roasted Moths (1997) (PC)
- Mikro Mortal Tennis (1996) (Amiga)

=== Other game industry credits ===
- Stefano is listed in the 'extra credits' of the 2013 Independent Games Festival (IGF) 'Student Showcase finalist' videogame ATUM for having acted as project supervisor and game design consultant.
- Stefano designed Necessary Evil, a small, critical video game developed together with Dino Dini, Marcello Gòmez Maureira and Jimena Sànchez Sarquiz. The game was presented at the 2013 Digital Games Research Association conference in Atlanta as an example of the meta-reflexive and critical potential of the medium.
- Stefano is listed in the credits of the 2012 action-adventure video game The Unfinished Swan (PlayStation 3, developed by Giant Sparrow) for having tested early versions of the game and having provided design-related feedback.
- Gualeni appears in the credits of Playlogic Entertainment's 2009 hack-and-slash video game Fairytale Fights (for PlayStation 3 and Xbox 360) for having helped with quality assurance recruiting and training.
- Stefano is thanked in the credits of the videogame EXP for having helped with the structuring of the game concept and having acted as project supervisor. EXP received honorable mention in the 2011 Independent Games Festival Student Showcase.
- Stefano is in the 'special thanks' section of the credits of the videogame Chewy! for having provided game design guidance. Chewy! was honored with the 'Best Design' award ($25,000) at the 2011 Independent Propeller Awards at the South by Southwest (SXSW) festival in Austin, Texas.
