= Gua-Le-Ni; or, The Horrendous Parade =

2011 video game

- Gua-Le-Ni app icon on iOS
- Developers: Double Jungle S.a.s. & Stefano Gualeni
- Publisher: Double Jungle S.a.s.
- Producer: Double Jungle S.a.s.
- Designer: Stefano Gualeni
- Programmer: Diego Zamprogno
- Platform: iOS
- Release: November the 28th, 2011
- Genres: Casual, puzzle video game
- Mode: Single player

Gua-Le-Ni; or, The Horrendous Parade is an action puzzle video game designed by Stefano Gualeni. Developed between 2011 and 2012 by Double Jungle S.a.S. and Stefano Gualeni, Gua-Le-Ni is the first commercially released casual video game that was designed and tuned with the support of biometric experiments.

== Metaphor ==
Gua-Le-Ni takes place on the wooden desk of an old, befuddled British taxonomist. On his desk, lies a fantastic book: a bestiary populated by finely drawn creatures. As for the monsters of myths and folklores in general, the impossible creatures in Gua-Le-Ni are combinations of parts of real animals.

The goal of the two main game modes of Gua-Le-Ni is that of recognizing the modular components of the fantastic creatures and their relative order before one of them manages to flee from the page (which is the game's ‘game over’ condition). Essentially, the game challenges the player with pattern-recognition mechanics in the form of a taxonomic enterprise. Mentored by the old taxonomist, the player pursues this purpose by rotating, moving and spinning toy-cubes with pictures of animal parts printed on the six faces of the cubes.

== Biometry ==
To complement a wider quality assurance campaign based on questionnaires, interviews, blind-testing and hard-core performance tests, the Dutch research team at Breda University of Applied Sciences ran an initial series of biometric tests on Gua-Le-Ni. The aim of these initial tests was to structure a game testing methodology incorporating the added perspective of biometry.

The first biometric analysis we ran on Gua-Le-Ni focused on its accessibility during the first few minutes of gameplay. The task that was assigned to the researchers was to determine biometrically the optimal speed of the game for the target audience indicated by the developers as soon as the player successfully completed the first tutorial. The game design goal in relation to the initial set of tests was that of achieving the feeling that the game was non-threatening and manageable at the most basic level of difficulty, hence likely resulting in an initially pleasant and positive experience for the casual audience the development team was designing for.

In terms of game logics, the initial speed of the game is determined by the initial walking speed of the beasts. In this sense, the results of the first test in terms of the walking speed of our bizarre creatures became a cornerstone for all the subsequent design decisions concerning the tuning of the speed and the complexity of the game.

A second series of tests was conducted two months after the initial experiments. The aim of this second series of tests was to understand how a player's performance develops during the first 10 minutes of gameplay.

An important point to clarify is that in the competitive version of the game, the walking speed of the paper creatures increases incrementally after a specific number of creatures have been correctly recognized. The idea behind this design parameter is that if our fantastic creatures are not properly fed, their actions become more frenzied as they grow hungrier in their search for food. In this phase of the testing, the development team wanted to find an ideal balance between the initial speed of the game and the rate of acceleration as players progressively gain skills during their advancement of the game. Specifically, we wanted to find answers to the following questions:

- Does the game allow players in our target audience to be proficient enough to endure play-sessions of five minutes after three or four games?
- Does the game make our players excited but not anxious?
- Do players have a generally positive reaction to the reaching of the Game Over state (which needs to be perceived as fair and encouraging)?

== Philosophy ==
From a philosophical perspective, the concept of Gua-Le-Ni was inspired by David Hume’s philosophical understanding of what a ‘complex idea’ is, as well as by the very example he used to elucidate the concept in his 1738 A Treatise of Human Nature. According to Hume, most people can be said to possess the mental concept of a Pegasus. This is patently due, for the Scottish philosopher to the fact that it is common for human beings to be exposed to Greek mythology. This is ostensibly also the case in the present century, where the Pegasus can still be encountered in books as well as in modern remediations of its folklore. In general, the Pegasus is presented as a divine horse that could fly using its legendary eagle wings and in David Hume’s work, it is introduced as an example of an idea that is not caused by direct, worldly experience, but is nevertheless an idea that we all have familiarity with. Nobody can truthfully claim to have seen a Pegasus, to have ridden, smelled or touched it, and yet the Pegasus is an idea that humans can fantasize of, discuss, write legends about, et cetera.

According to Hume, the idea of a Pegasus does not fall under the category of simple ideas, which is to say ideas that can be simply derived by having sensory ‘impressions’ of the objects the idea corresponds to. The Pegasus but must therefore be recognized as a complex idea: a mental combination of elements and properties of which the human mind had previous experience of and eventually creatively combined in a new idea. In other words, a complex idea (the Pegasus) is a combination of two or more simple ideas (a horse and an eagle) or parts and properties thereof.

By means of fantastic beasts of the same combinatorial nature as Hume’s Pegasus, Gua-Le-Ni; or, The Horrendous Parade challenges the players to twist the creative capabilities described in the Enquiry Concerning Human Understanding on their heads and use them as game mechanics: impossible paper beasts will parade across the screen (the page of a fantastic bestiary) only to be recognized as combinations of parts of existing animals. In other words, the main game mechanic of Gua-Le-Ni is a playful and interactive material interpretation of the Humean notion of ‘complex ideas’.
