= Tony Tough and the Night of Roasted Moths =

1999 video game

- North American cover art
- Developers: Nayma Software; Prograph Research
- Publishers: ITA: Protonic Interactive; NA: Got Game Entertainment
- Designer: Stefano Gualeni
- Artist: Valerio Massari
- Platforms: Windows, macOS, Linux
- Release: Windows: ITA: 1999; NA: October 31, 2002; macOS, Linux: WW: May 7, 2015
- Genre: Adventure game
- Mode: Single-player

Tony Tough and the Night of Roasted Moths is a 1999 adventure game developed by Nayma Software.

The game's first appearance was in December 1997 in Turin during the multimedia event Saloon.bit at Nayma Expo-Stand and then on March 24, 1998 in Florence during the MediARTech International Exhibition, where the game got attention from main Italian computer magazines and distributors.

Tony Tough received one sequel: Tony Tough 2: A Rake's Progress (2006). In 2011, Tony Tough entered the ScummVM project. On October 24, 2012, the game was launched again under license from DotEmu, a retro-gaming company based in Paris, France.

== Gameplay ==
Players control the titular Tony Tough, a private detective described as "a gnome-sized, nasal-voiced hypochondriac momma’s boy", guiding him through the game by positioning the cursor over objects and instructing Tony to interact with them. The game shares many traits with titles such as Day of the Tentacle, which it has been compared with by reviewers. These include a focus on conversations with strange characters, puzzle solving, and combining and using items found throughout the game. The graphics and animation are cartoon-like. Two modes of play are present; beginner mode has fewer puzzles and does not feature the two in-game mini-games.

== Development ==
Tony Tough began development in 1997. It was released in 1999.

=== International release ===
In France, the game was released in 2003 by Focus Home Interactive. The publisher was inspired to release the game because of the commercial success of Runaway: A Road Adventure.

== Reception ==
Reception

Review score
Publication	Score
The Electric Playground	6.5/10

Tony Tough's German publisher, DTP Entertainment, remarked in 2004 that the game's performance in the region was "satisfying, but I would lie if I talked of a 'hit'." They noted that sales had been damaged by competition from Broken Sword: The Sleeping Dragon and Uru: Ages Beyond Myst, thanks to its launch during the holiday shopping season. In France, Focus Home Interactive's Cédric Lagarrigue reported conservative sales forecasts for Tony Tough, but said in August 2003 that its "first sales results are satisfactory". Summarizing its overall commercial performance, Randy Sluganski of Just Adventure remarked that the game "just did not sell."

== See also ==
- El Tesoro de Isla Alcachofa
- Hollywood Monsters
- The Watchmaker
- Tony Tough 2: A Rake's Progress
