= Hiroyasu Tomiie =

Japanese architect (1919~2007)

- Born: 1 July 1919; Kagawa, Empire of Japan
- Died: 21 December 2007 (aged 88); Kyoto, Japan
- Education: Kyoto University
- Occupation: Architect
- Awards: Medal of Purple Ribbon
- Buildings: Mie Prefectural Art Museum, St. Francis Xavier Cathedral, Kyoto, Headquarters building of Kyoto Shimbun, Kyoto City University of Arts (Kutsukake campus), Ritsumeikan University (Kinugasa campus)

Hiroyasu Tomiie (富家 宏泰, Tomiie Hiroyasu) (July 1, 1919 - December 21, 2007) was a Japanese architect in postwar Japan. He is best known as the architect who led the world of modernist architecture after World War II in Japan.

== Biography ==
In July 1919, shortly after his birth in Kagawa Prefecture, his family emigrated to the Korean Peninsula. However, when Tomiie was a child, other family members, except for children, were all dead due to typhus that spread in the territory. After being repatriated, Tomiie was taken in and raised by one of his relative families in Shimogamo, Kyoto. After graduating from the Third Higher School, which was the predecessor of the Department of Integrated Human Studies at Kyoto University (京都大学総合人間学部), Tomiie entered the Department of Architecture at Kyoto Imperial University (now the Department of Architecture, Faculty of Engineering, Kyoto University). Soon after entering the university, he was drafted into the Imperial Japanese Army and was forced to serve in North Manchuria, but after the war ended, he returned to school and graduated from the Department of Architecture at Kyoto University. After graduation, he attended the graduate school and became a lecturer in Professor Ryo Tanabashi's architectural design laboratory at Kyoto University. While at school, he studied from Ryo Tanabashi, who was known for a designer of Kyoto Tower and Akashi Municipal Planetarium (Akashi, Hyogo). Tomiie also learnt architecture from Professor Keiichi Morita. In October 1952, Tomiie established his own architectural firm Tomiie Kenchiku-Jimusho (富家建築事務所), which was well received and grew to have more than 300 employees, including full-time staff not only in design and planning but also in facilities, structure, and other areas of architecture. The firm later dissolved due to the end of the economic bubble in Japan, but Tomiie himself continued to work as an architect. Tomiie has designed many of the postwar new buildings in Kyoto, especially public works such as school buildings, libraries, museums, gymnasiums, and office buildings. He also involved with many projects in other prefectures such as Mie, Ishikawa, Hyogo, and Chiba. The total number of buildings he designed in his lifetime exceeds 2000. In 1958, he was awarded the Medal of Purple Ribbon from the Japanese government. His activities were not limited to architectural practice, as he also dedicated himself in fostering future generations in the architectural world. For example, he assumed a position of vice president of the Japan Institute of Architects and established Kyoto Architectural Design Supervision Association (京都設計監理協会).

== Tomiie Modernism ==
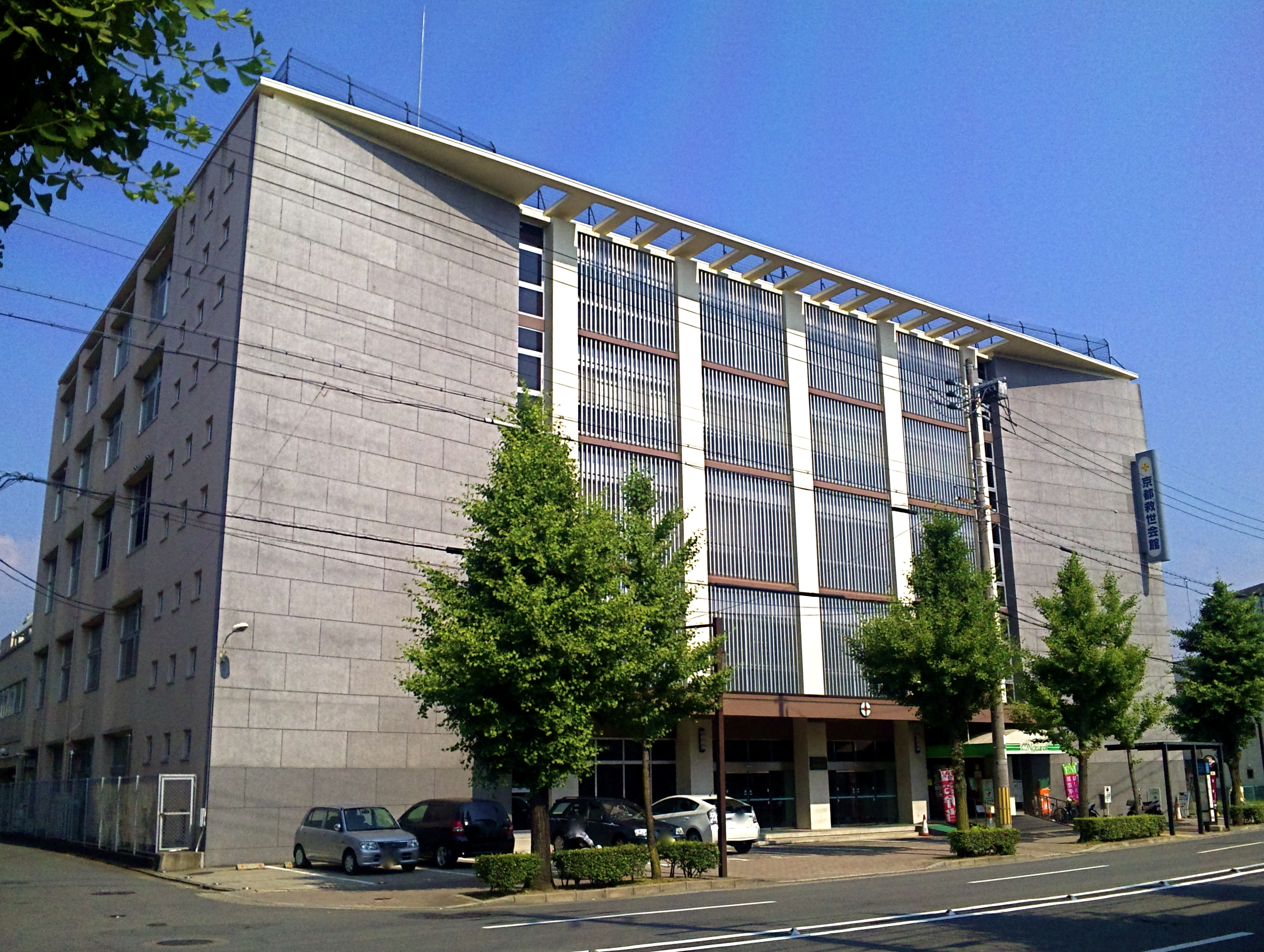
Koushinkan Hall (Ritsumeikan University Hirokoji Camus (1962)；Demolished)

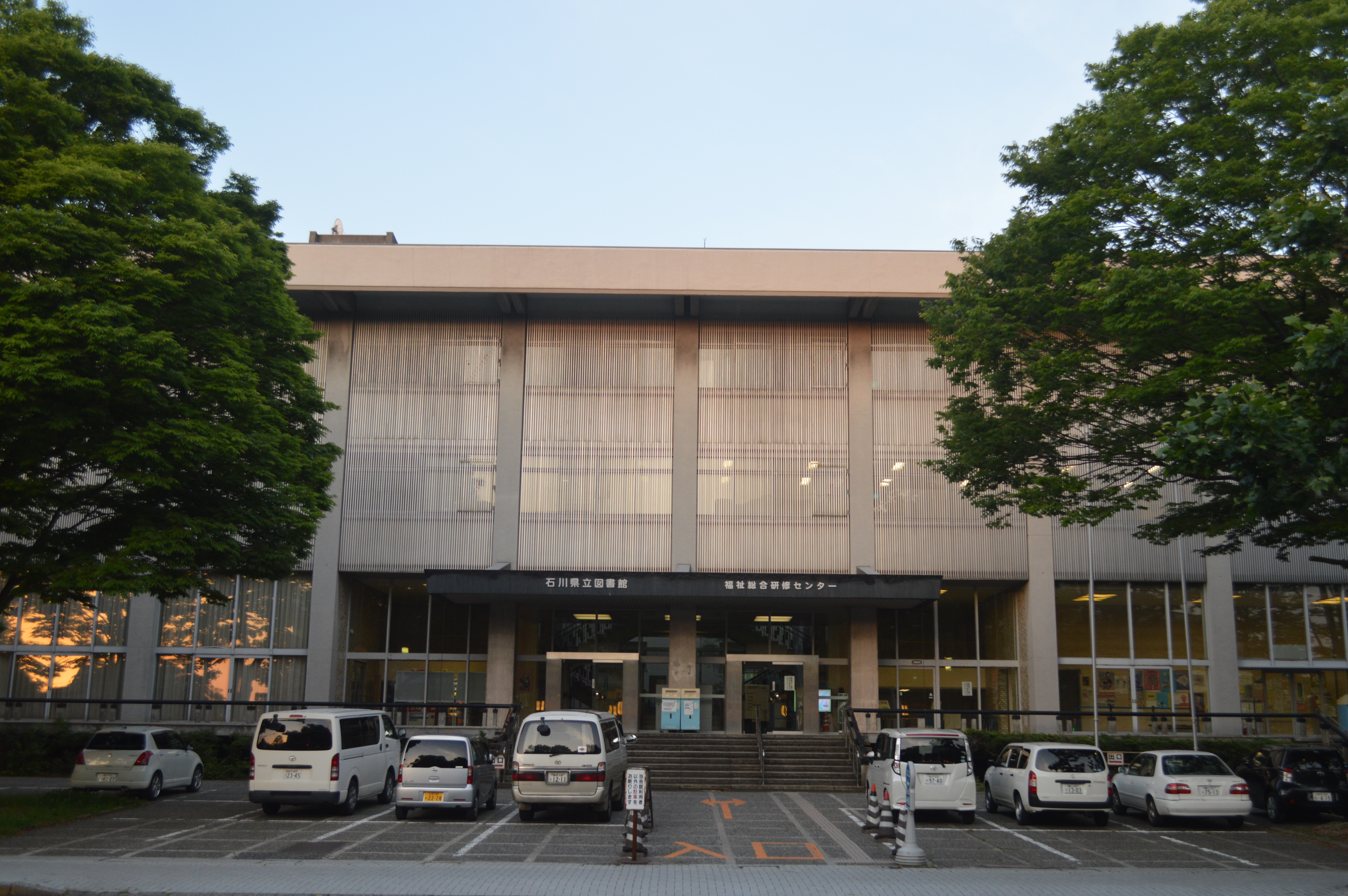
Ishikawa Prefectural Library (1963)

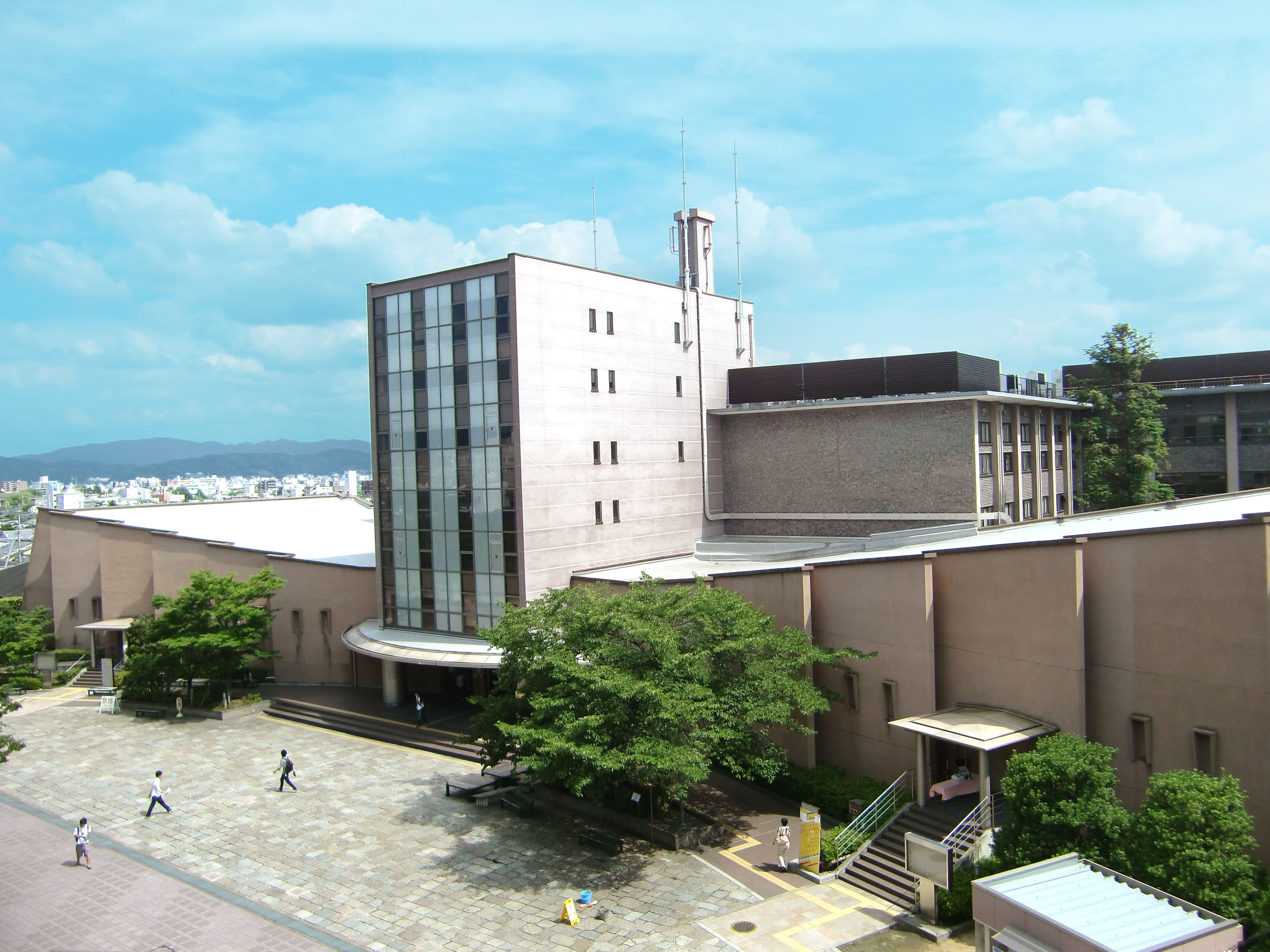
Igakukan Hall（Ritsumeikan University Kinugasa Campus (1965)）

It is said that most of Tomiie's works rarely deviate from the basic elements of modern architecture. However, in his works such as “Koshinkan Hall” (built in 1962, later demolished) of Hirokoji campus of Ritsumeikan University, “Ishikawa Prefectural Library” (1963), and “Kyoto Chamber of Commerce and Industry Building” (1963, later demolished), he used lattices, which have long been used in Japanese traditional architecture, on the walls and windows in those works, in order to remind people of old Japanese or Kyoto style. Furthermore, in “Igakukan Hall” (1965), in Kinugasa campus of Ritsumeikan University, which is one of his masterpieces in the 60s, he attempted to depart from the dogmatic elements of modernism. In example, an abstract form of architecture that did not favor symmetry and eliminated symbolic elements such as towers. Tomiie placed a huge stair hall in front of the building, and symmetrically placed lecture halls on the east and west sides of the tower. Therefore, the building looks as if a condor were spreading its wings. Tomiie used Taizan tiles, a traditional Kyoto pottery from Taizan Seitosho or porcelain factory, on the concrete walls of Igakukan Hall. While the design of the building itself is based on typical modernism in its architectural style, it is clear that Tomiie attempted to seek an affinity between modern architecture and the Kyoto’s landscape by using Japanese hand-made tiles for the walls. Such attempts also can be seen in the symbolic shape of the large roof of the Catholic Kawaramachi Church, which was completed in 1967.

== Notable works ==
- Headquarters building of Kyoto Shimbun (1959)
- Doshisha University Student Memorial Hall (1962; demolished)
- St. Francis Xavier Cathedral, Kyoto (1967)
- Kyoto City University of Arts (Kutsukake campus, 1978)
- Ishikawa Prefectural Library (1966)
- Ishikawa Prefectural Museum of Art (1966)
- Wajima Museum of Urushi Art (1981)
- Kindai University Hospital (1975)
- Mie Prefectural Art Museum (1982)
- Tanizaki Jun'ichirō Memorial Museum of Literature, Ashiya (1988)
- Chiba Marine Stadium (1990)
