= Something Something Soup Something =

2017 browser video game

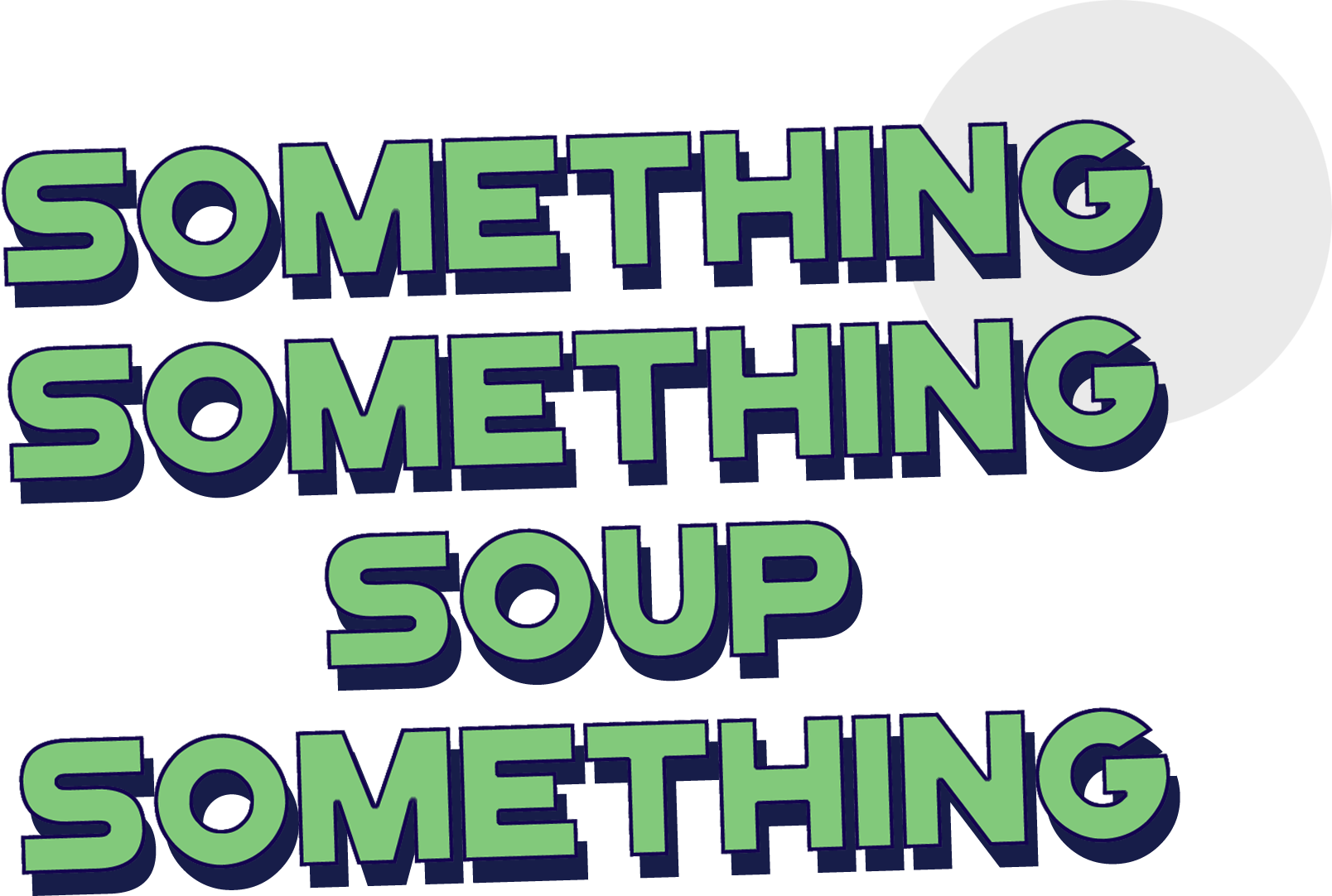
- Developer: Stefano Gualeni
- Director: Stefano Gualeni
- Designers: Stefano Gualeni; Johnathan Harrington
- Programmers: Isabelle Kniestedt; Marcello Gomez Maureira
- Artist: Isabelle Kniestedt
- Composer: Riccardo Fassone
- Engine: Unity
- Platforms: Microsoft Windows; MacOS; Linux; Web
- Release: 2017
- Genre: Point and click
- Mode: Single-player

Something Something Soup Something is a free browser video game (also released on Microsoft Windows, MacOS, and Linux) and "interactive thought experiment" developed by Stefano Gualeni and his team at the Institute of Digital Games. It was released in late 2017. In the game, the player must decide whether or not things are, in their opinion, soup. The game is inspired on the work of philosopher Ludwig Wittgenstein and on the linguistic experiments of Eleanor Rosch and Carolyn B. Mervis.

== Gameplay ==
An example of one of the more outlandish "soups" in Something Something Soup Something.

The player character is instructed to turn on a teleportation machine. After completing a small mini-game in which the player must line up a small white dot with a line on a monitor, the main part of the game is unlocked. From a machine, bowls of "candidates for soup" are dropped down, and the player has the choice of deciding whether or not it is soup by pressing one button or another. If the player presses the "Soup" button to accept the item as soup, it is teleported away. If the player chooses the "Not Soup" button, it is dumped. After judging several bowls of soup, the player will be met with a screen that shows, based on data from the game, what the qualifiers are for what makes something soup in their opinion.

== Plot ==
In the year 2078, humans have perfected teleportation technology, and are using it to exploit aliens to make them cheap goods. The player takes the role of a worker who is tasked with judging whether or not items aliens make are soup, due to them often not understanding the idea of what defines soup.

== Development ==
During the development of the game, focus groups were organized in several different countries in order for the developers to keep the game as unbiased as possible.

== Reception ==
Something Something Soup Something has inspired much thought into reviewers over "what soup is". Nathan Grayson of Kotaku said that the game presented many heavy philosophical questions. The game was also reviewed by Paula Mejia of Atlas Obscura, stating that the point of the game is that "Soup can be anything, everything, and nothing all at once."
