= Tony Tough 2: A Rake's Progress =

2006 video game

- Developer: Dtp-entertainment
- Publisher: Dtp-entertainment
- Designer: Stefano Gualeni
- Platform: Windows
- Release: 2006
- Genre: Adventure game

Tony Tough 2: A Rake's Progress is a 2006 Windows adventure game designed by Stefano Gualeni and published by Dtp-entertainment. It is the sequel to Tony Tough and the Night of Roasted Moths (1999).

== Gameplay ==
A prequel to Tony Tough and the Night of Roasted Moths, A Rake's Progress was designed following the structure and the organization of two existing works with the same title:

- A Rake's Progress: a set of eight prints published in 1735 by William Hogarth
- A Rake's Progress: sixteen plates created in 1963 by David Hockney

The story of Tony Tough 2 follows a day in the life of Tony Tough as he investigates alien landings and ancient Indian cultures in his hometown of Washington, New Mexico during the early 1950s.

Gameplay focuses on conversations with strange characters, puzzle solving, and combining and using items found throughout the game with the objective to make sense out of a mystery which involves the disappearance of seven ancient statues and Tony's own maid, Cornelia Cook, as well as the death of Cornelia's grandmother Florence Cook (allegedly inspired by Katie King).

In addition, the game (like other works inspired by Hogarth's The Rake's Progress (as well as his A Harlot's Progress)) follows the regression of the main character and the loss of the qualities which made him human in the first place. In A Rake's Progress, the loss of Tony Tough's innocence, as well as his beloved dog Pantagruel, coincides with him developing into a private detective.

== Reception ==
Reception

Review score
Publication	Score
PC Games	47/100

PC Games says what the game is about can hardly be determined, that "Tony jogs across the screen in what feels like slow motion", and that the perspective often jumps back and forth so wildly that one would wish for a compass on the edge of the screen for orientation.

== See also ==
- Ankh: Heart of Osiris
- Runaway 2: The Dream of the Turtle
- Sam & Max Save the World
