= Toshiya Kakiuchi =

Japanese businessman (born 1989)

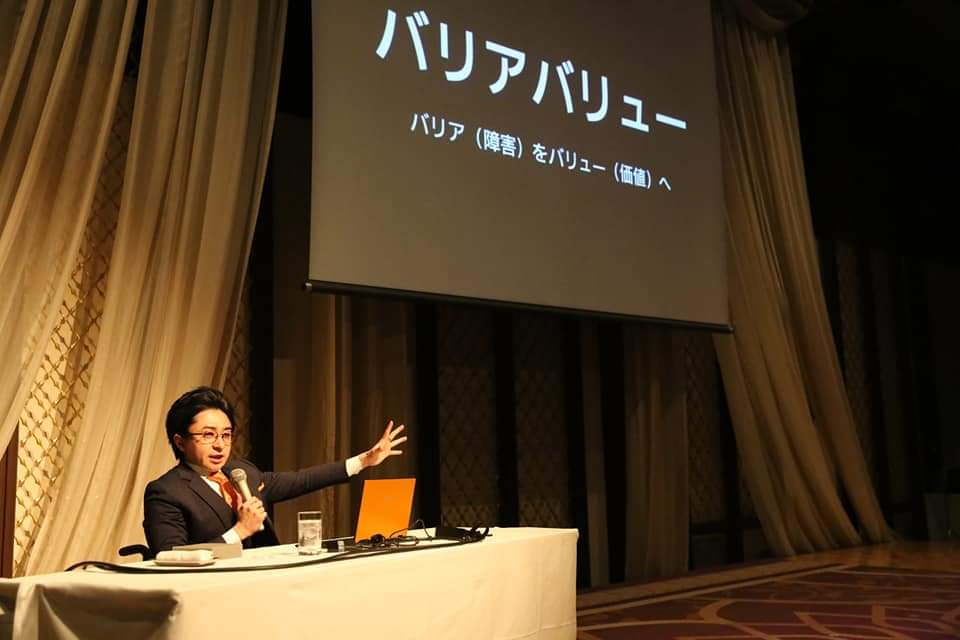
- At Hotel Hankyu International, 2019
- Born: 14 April 1989 (age 37); Gifu Prefecture, Nakatsugawa, Japan
- Education: Ritsumeikan University, College of Business Administration
- Occupation: Businessman

Toshiya Kakuchi (born April 14, 1989) is a Japanese businessman. He is the founder and president of Mirairo Incorporated. He is also the president of the Japan Universal Manners Association, which provides education and certification in universally applicable manners, with a particular focus on manners regarding persons with disabilities and the elderly.

== Personal Information ==
Kakiuchi was born in Anjō, Aichi Prefecture, Japan, in 1989. From his early childhood until he entered university he lived in Nakatsugawa, Gifu Prefecture. He began suffering multiple bone fractures from an early age due to the bone condition osteogenesis imperfecta, and has undergone more than fifteen corrective operations.

He entered Nakatsugawa High School in Gifu Prefecture in 2004, but dropped out in order to pursue a rehabilitation program for his medical condition. He later obtained the Certificate for Students Achieving the Proficiency Level of Upper Secondary School Graduates (the former University Entrance Qualification Examination) that allowed him to take university entrance exams in Japan.

In 2008, he entered the College of Business Administration at Ritsumeikan University. In the second year of his studies, he established a company with a classmate, and received 13 awards in business plan contests run by public institutions, newspapers, and other organizations.

In 2010, he used prize money that he had won at business plan contests to set up Mirairo, Inc. At the time he established Mirairo, he was almost unable to eat and subsisted mainly on soy milk. At the time of the 2011 Tōhoku earthquake and tsunami in 2011, he was involved in the relief work, sending wheelchairs to those in need. He collaborated with the manga artist Takehiko Inoue, engaging in activities with a worldwide scope.

In 2013, he was awarded the Grand Prix at the Minna no Yume business awards (Everyone's Dream Awards), sponsored by Nippon Broadcasting System, Inc. At this time, he gave a presentation to an audience of 8,000 people at the Budokan Hall in Tokyo. He refused the twenty million yen cash prize for the Grand Prix award, stating that "What we need is not two million yen but rather job opportunities that will allow us to create two million yen's worth of value." In the same month, April 2013, he announced that he would temporarily suspend his business activities in order to undergo an operation. He did not recover well from the surgery, and fell into a coma three days later following a cardiac arrest. Following several months of rehabilitation, he returned to work. In August 2013, he announced a business partnership with Dentsu, Inc. in the field of Universal Design.

In 2014, he was listed as one of Japan's 100 Most Influential People by Nikkei Business Publications Inc. He has used a wheelchair since childhood, and until establishing Mirairo competed in wheelchair racing and wheelchair basketball events.

== Resume ==
- 1995 - Graduated from Keiho Gakuen's Suginoko Kindergarten
- 2001 - Graduated from Naegi Elementary School in Nakatsugawa
- 2004 - Graduated from Naegi Middle School in Nakatsugawa
- 2006 - Dropped out of Nakatsugawa High School in Gifu Prefecture
- 2008 - Entered the College of Business Administration at Ritsumeikan University
- 2009 - Founded the Value Added Network (now Mirairo, Inc.)
- 2010 - Established Mirairo, Inc. and assumed the position of company president
- 2011 - Received the Grand Prix at the Kinki Region Human Resources Awards
- 2012 - Graduated from the College of Business Administration at Ritsumeikan University
- 2013 - Received the Grand Prix at the Minna no Yume business awards (Everyone's Dream Awards), sponsored by Nippon Broadcasting System, Inc.
- 2013 - Became president of the Japan Universal Manners Association
- 2014 - Selected as one of "Japan's 100 Most Influential People", Nikkei Business Publications Inc.

== Awards and prizes ==
- March 17, 2015 - Selected as one of the FY2014 Diversity Management Selection 100 by the Ministry of Economy, Trade and Industry
- January 30, 2013 - Grand Prix at the Minna no Yume business awards (Everyone's Dream Awards), sponsored by Nippon Broadcasting System, Inc.
- December 17, 2011 - CB/CSO Award for Excellence, sponsored by Osaka City
- August 7, 2011 - Grand Prix at the Kinki Region Human Resources Awards
- December 11, 2010 - Grand Prix at the CB Plan Competition, sponsored by Osaka City
- December 4, 2010 - Top award in the 7th Ritsumeikan University Student Venture Contest
- November 21, 2010 - Second Prize at the 2nd Universal Venture Awards
- May 9, 2010 - Venture Region Student Assistance Award at the 6th Soroptimist International of the Americas-Japan Chuo Region Awards
- March 12, 2010 - Venture Region Student Assistance Award and Kyoto Club Prize from the 6th Soroptimist International of the Americas-Japan Chuo Region Awards
- March 3, 2010 - Special Review Committee Prize at the 6th National Campus Venture Grand Prix, Osaka
- January 20, 2010 - Grand Business Prize at the 11th Campus Venture Grand Prix, Osaka
- 2005 - Selected for the 2nd International Exhibition for Young Inventors
- 2005 - Patent Office Director's Prize, at the 63rd All-Japan Invention and Innovation Exhibition for Young Students
- 2004 - Chubu Economy and Industry Director's Prize at the Invention and Innovation Exhibition, Gifu Prefecture

== Media ==
Newspapers

- May 3, 2015 - The Japan Times "Omotenashi a facade, wheelchair-bound consultant says"
- May 9, 2014 - Mainichi Forum "Towards the Japan of Tomorrow: Toshiya Kakiuchi, President of Mirairo, Inc."
- October 16, 2012 - Tokyo Foundation "Independent Living for People with Disabilities"
