= Ritsumeikan Uji Junior and Senior High School =

Coordinates: 34.8690°N 135.7966°E

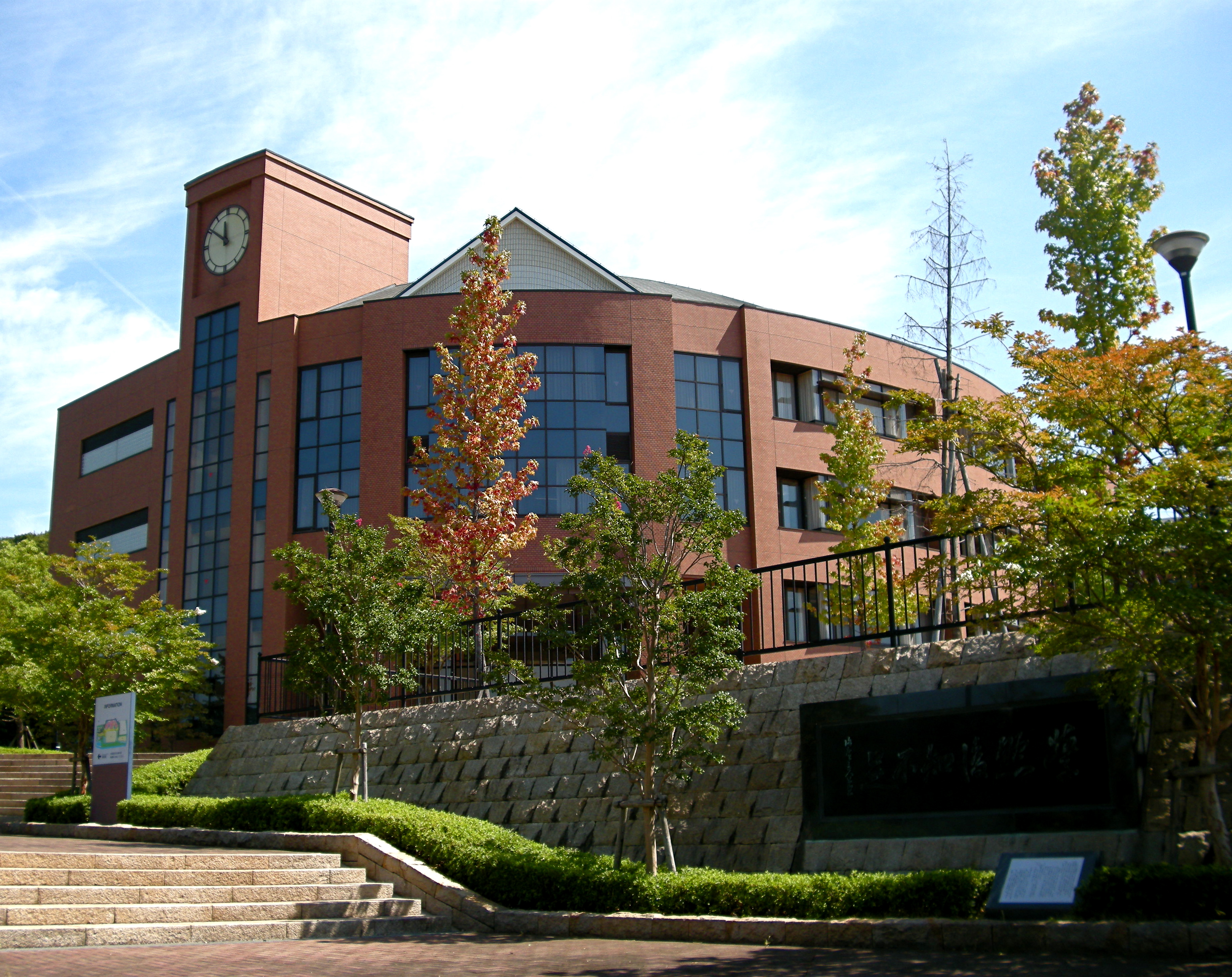
- Uji, Kyoto; Japan

Information
- Type: Independent & Day
- Established: 1994 (High school) 2003 (Junior high school)
- Principal: Noriko Ochi
- Classes offered: International Baccalaureate course, Immersion course, Science course, Humanities course
- Website: en.ritsumei.ac.jp/uji/

Ritsumeikan Uji Junior and Senior High School (立命館宇治中学校・高等学校) (also known as Rits Uji) is a private school located in the city of Uji, Kyoto Prefecture, Japan, south of Kyoto City. The high school opened in 1994 and the middle school opened in 2003. It is currently one of four junior and senior high schools affiliated with Ritsumeikan University. The Ritsumeikan family of schools also includes Ritsumeikan Asia Pacific University, located in Beppu, and Ritsumeikan Primary School, located in north Kyoto.

The school is noted for its English language education programs and athletic achievement. The school introduced English immersion education in 2000, and in 2002, was designated a Super English Language (SEL) high school by the Japanese government. In 2009, the school was authorized by the IBO as the first Article 1 (government approved) Japanese institution in the Kansai region to provide the IB Diploma Program (IBDP). In 2014, the school was selected as a Super Global High School by the Japanese government, and in 2019 a World-Wide Learning (WWL) Hub School, both of which earned the school sizable supplementary grants.

In athletics, the school has a rich history of success in women's Ekiden relays, including multiple national championships. It also has had national level success in men's soccer, American football, baton twirling, baseball, and other sports.

== Overview ==
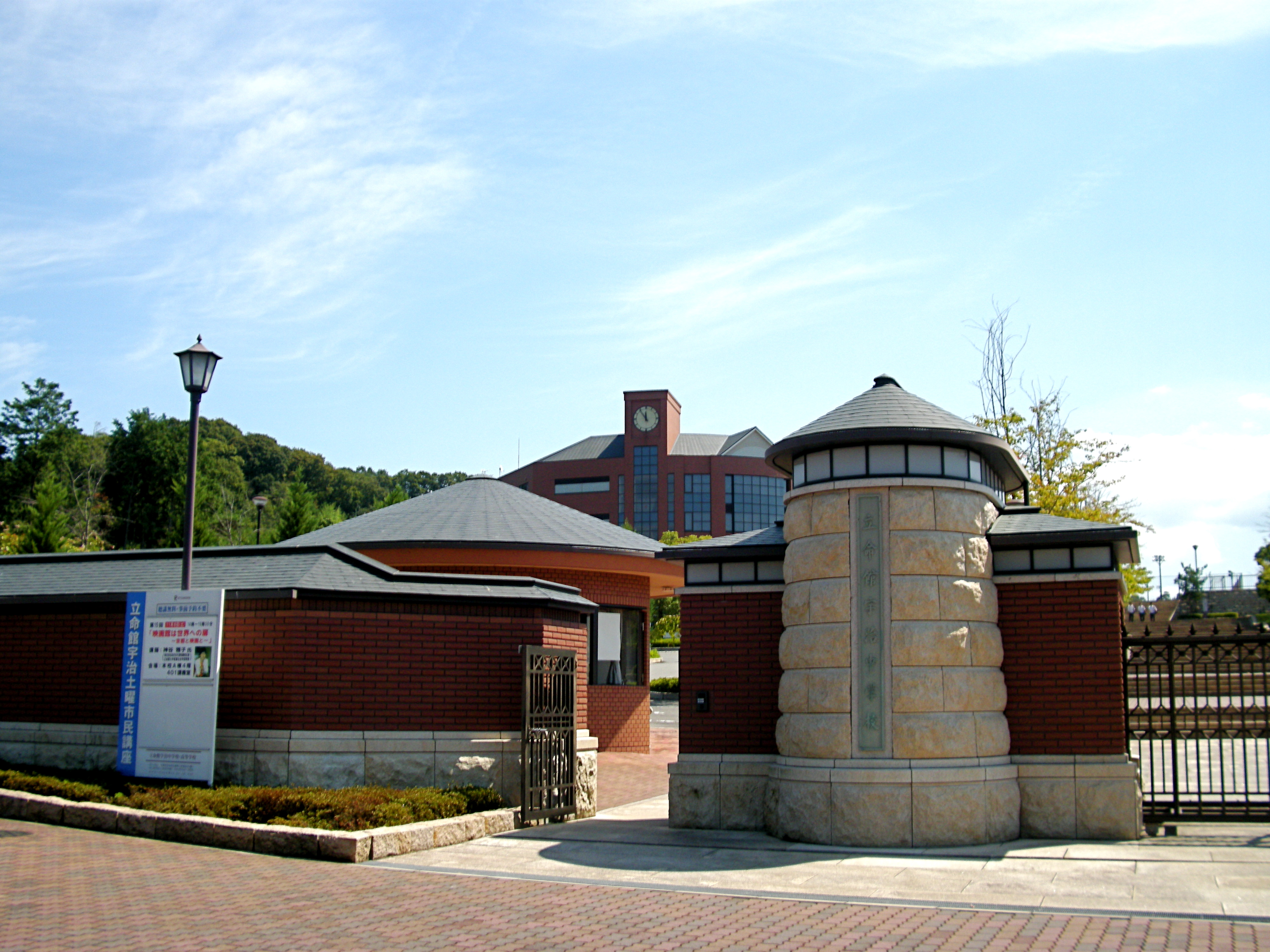
School's front gate

== Junior high school ==
The junior high school consists of five home rooms per grade year and has between 160 and 170 students per grade. Like the high school, the junior high school is known for its English language achievement and international-friendly environment. Roughly a quarter of all students have experience studying abroad and/or have English as a native language. The school offers four levels of English A1, A2, A3, and Regular. Most of the A1 students take part in the International Preparatory Stream (IPS), which prepares students to matriculate to the school's English language IBDP course.

Junior high school students are expected to take part in one of the school's many sports and culture clubs so as to experience a full school life of study and club. While the majority of students are Japanese, the school welcomes students with Japanese as a second language and offers JSL classes to students who require such support.

== High school ==
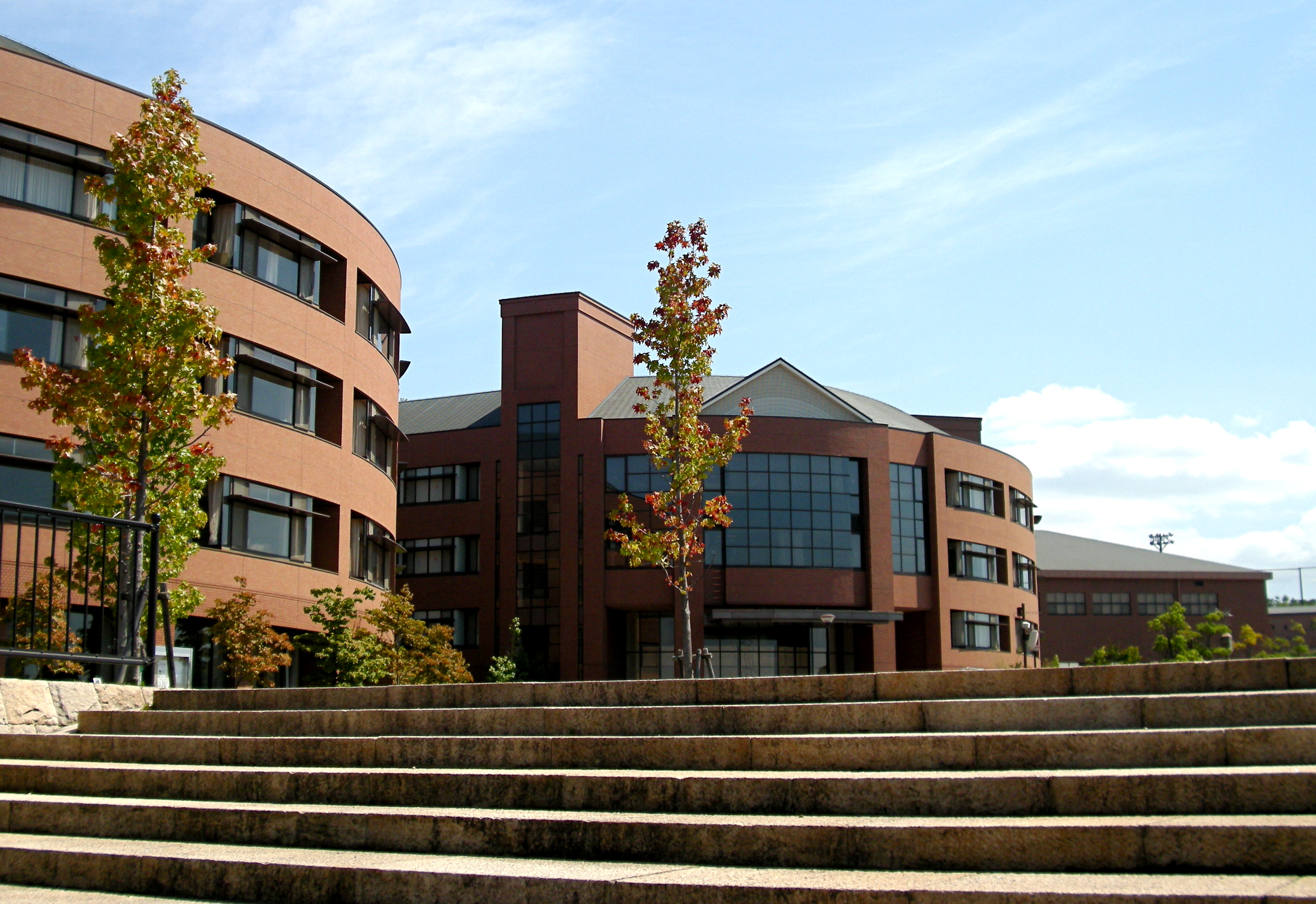
B Building

The high school was the second affiliated high school established within the Ritsumeikan Academy. In each grade, there are approximately 350 to 360 students. Students select one of three courses, the Integrated Global Course (IG), the Immersion Course (IM), or the International Baccalaureate Course (IB).

=== IG Course ===
The IG or Integrated Global is the largest course in the school. The language of instruction is Japanese. All students also take English classes according to their level, and French, German, and Chinese language classes are also available. IG students select either the Science Career Stream or the Global Career Stream.

The majority of students in the IG Course matriculate to one of the Ritsumeikan University campuses, though a minority matriculate to other schools in Japan. Therefore, the IG Course is a primarily a feeder course for Ritsumeikan University and Ritsumeikan Asia Pacific University.

=== IM Course ===
The IM course offers blended English and Japanese instruction and is designed for students who wish to become fluent in English in high school. First year coursework is in both languages, and from midway through their first year students go abroad to study for a whole academic year either in either Canada, Australia, or New Zealand. For their senior year, the bulk of classes are in English. Many IM students matriculate at Ritsumeikan University, while others chose schools in the Tokyo region. A small number of students from the IM Course elect to study overseas for university. Each year the 2nd year students from the IM course go to Cambodia for a study trip.

=== IB Course ===
Authorized by the IBO in 2009, the IB course has around 25 to 30 students per grade. All classes are taught in English by native-level speakers with the exception of Japanese language and literature classes. First-year classes prepare students for the challenge of the IB Diploma, and in the second and third year students study IB Diploma classes of their choice. The IB Course offers students the opportunity to earn a dual degree: the universally recognized IB Diploma as well as a standard Japanese high school diploma. Around half of the students matriculate internally from the junior high school, and the other half enter from other Japanese junior high schools or schools overseas.

The majority of students in the IB course typically choose to study at universities other than Ritsumeikan University. Historically, approximately half of the graduates have gone to study overseas and half have remained in Japan. The IB Course regularly achieves marks well above the world norm, with multiple students earning outstanding scores of over 40 (out of 45) in the IBDP. In 2012, one student achieved a rare perfect 45.

IB Diploma subjects include:

- Group 5: Japanese A Literature SL/HL, English Literature SL/HL, English Language and Literature SL/HL
- Group 4: Japanese B SL/HL, English B SL/HL
- Group 3: Global Issues SL/HL, Business SL/HL, Economics SL/HL
- Group 2: Physics SL/HL, Chemistry SL/HL, Biology SL/HL
- Group 1: Mathematics SL/HL
- Group 0: Art SL/HL

=== High School Dorm-Firits House ===
High school students can choose to live in the school's dormitory, known as Firits House. The dormitory is fully equipped for student living and is located 20 minutes from the school by bus in the town of Uji. The dormitory has the capacity to house 380 students. Many of the students in the dormitory are either in athletics or the IB Course, as students come from around the country and the world for the school's outstanding offerings in these areas.

== School Events ==
=== Sports Festival（体育祭） ===
The school holds a traditional Japanese sports festivals every May. The entire school population participates in either the junior high or high school festival, which this is one of the most exciting and memorable events of the school year.

=== Kofusai(興風祭) ===
The school holds a culture festival, known as Kofusai every September over several days. This festival showcases student creativity in many areas such as song and dance, calligraphy, and dramatic performance. All students decorate their home room according to a theme they choose, and Kofusai is well attended by parents and friends.

=== Choir Competition ===
The choir competition is held by junior high school students in November, and features all classes competing against each other the school auditorium. Students prepare for weeks for this big event, which is well attended by parents.

== Academic Achievements ==
=== Matriculation ===
As noted above, the majority of students from Ritsumeikan Uji matriculate at either Ritsumeikan University or Ritsumeikan Asia Pacific University, while a healthy minority attend other Japanese private, public, and national universities, as well American, British, Canadian, Australian and other overseas universities. The school has placed students at leading universities and colleges around the world including Brown University, Dartmouth College, Amherst College, Imperial College London, King's College London, Leiden University, the University of Melbourne, the University of British Columbia, the University of Toronto, Waseda University, Sophia University, Osaka University, and many others.

== School Clubs ==
=== High school ===
Culture Clubs:

- Art and Literature
- Art
- Brass Band
- Broadcasting
- Calligraphy
- Drama
- Flower Arrangement
- International Challenge Club (ICC)
- Photography
- Natural Science/Robotics
- Tea Ceremony

Athletic Clubs:

- American Football
- Baseball
- Basketball (Boys'/Girls')
- Badminton (Boys'/Girls')
- Baton Twirling
- Cheerleading
- Dance
- Handball
- Japanese Swordsmanship
- Judo
- Rugby
- Soccer
- Ski
- Swimming
- Tennis (Boys'/Girls')
- Track and Field
- Volleyball
- Women's Lacrosse
