= Suh Sung =

Zainichi Korean academic (born 1945)

- Born: 3 April 1945 (age 81); Kyoto, Japan
- Education: Tokyo University of Education; Seoul National University
- Spouse: Pak Sunmi
- Children: 2
- Relatives: Suh Joon-sik (brother)
- Writing career
- Language: Japanese, Korean
- Notable work: Unbroken Spirits: Nineteen Years in South Korea's Gulag (1994)
- Notable awards: Tada Yoko Human Rights Award (1994)

Korean name
- Hangul: 서승
- Hanja: 徐勝
Transcriptions
- Revised Romanization: Seo Seung
- McCune–Reischauer: Sŏ Sŭng

Japanese name
- Kanji: 徐勝
- Kana: ソ・スン
Transcriptions
- Romanization: So Sun

Suh Sung (Korean: 서승; born 3 April 1945) is a Zainichi Korean academic and writer. He was previously a Professor of International Studies at Ritsumeikan University and a research advisor at the Ritsumeikan Center for Korean Studies. His specializations include contemporary Korean law and politics, human rights law in East Asia, and comparative human rights law.

== Biography ==
Suh was born on 3 April 1945 in Kyoto, Japan, to Zainichi Korean parents. He received his elementary and secondary school education in Japan, and graduated from Tokyo University of Education in March 1968. Suh then travelled to South Korea to continue his studies at the Graduate School of Sociology at Seoul National University, during the regime of Park Chung-hee.

On 18 April 1971, shortly after returning to South Korea from a trip to Japan to see his family, Suh was arrested on suspicion of being a North Korean spy and sentenced to life imprisonment. While in custody and under heavy interrogation and torture, Suh lit himself on fire but survived with severe burns to his face. Suh's sentenced was reduced to 20 years on 21 December 1988, and he was released on 28 February 1990, after being imprisoned for nearly 19 years. He has been described as a political prisoner.

Suh was a Professor of International Studies at Ritsumeikan University in Japan from 1998 to 2018. His autobiography Unbroken Spirits: Nineteen Years in South Korea's Gulag details his experience as a political prisoner.
