= Ritsumeikan University =

Private university in Kyoto, Japan

- 立命館大学
- Former name: Kyoto Hosei School
- Motto: 自由と清新
- Motto in English: Freedom and Innovation
- Type: Private
- Established: 1900; 126 years ago (chartered in 1922)
- Founders: Kojuro Nakagawa; Saionji Kinmochi
- Academic affiliations: APSIA, INU, Global 30, Kansai Big 6
- President: Yoshio Nakatani
- Faculty: 1,395
- Students: 36,825
- Undergraduates: 33,094
- Postgraduates: 3,731
- Location: Kyoto (Kyoto), Kusatsu (Shiga), Ibaraki (Osaka), Osaka (Osaka), Chiyoda (Tokyo), Japan; 35°01′57″N 135°43′26″E
- Campus: 5 campuses in urban areas
- Colours: Crimson and white
- Nickname: Ritsumeikan Panthers
- Mascot: Panthera pardus
- Website: Official website
- As of May 2022

Ritsumeikan University (Japanese: 立命館大学, Hepburn: Ritsumeikan Daigaku; abbreviated to Rits and 立命 Ritsumei) is a private university in Kyoto, Japan, that traces its origin to 1869. In addition to its main campus in Kyoto, the university also has satellite campuses in Ibaraki, Osaka and Kusatsu, Shiga.

Today, Ritsumeikan University is known as one of Western Japan's most prestigious universities, part of the "Kan-Kan-Do-Rits" (関関同立: Kwansei Gakuin University, Kansai University, Doshisha University, and Ritsumeikan University) abbreviation that refers to the four leading private universities in the Keihanshin region.

Ritsumeikan University is known for its Social Sciences, particularly International Relations (IR), as well as its Science & Engineering departments, with the Graduate School of International Relations being the only Japanese member of the Association of Professional Schools of International Affairs.

It is a leading Japanese university that maintains a Confucius Institute, which have close ties to the Chinese Communist Party on its campus, and are actively engaged in promoting Chinese culture.A former members of the Japanese Communist Party in parliament have conducted propaganda activities on campus, and the party's newspaper has published articles hinting at a strong connection.Wen Jiabao Wang Yi and others were visiting this university.

== History ==
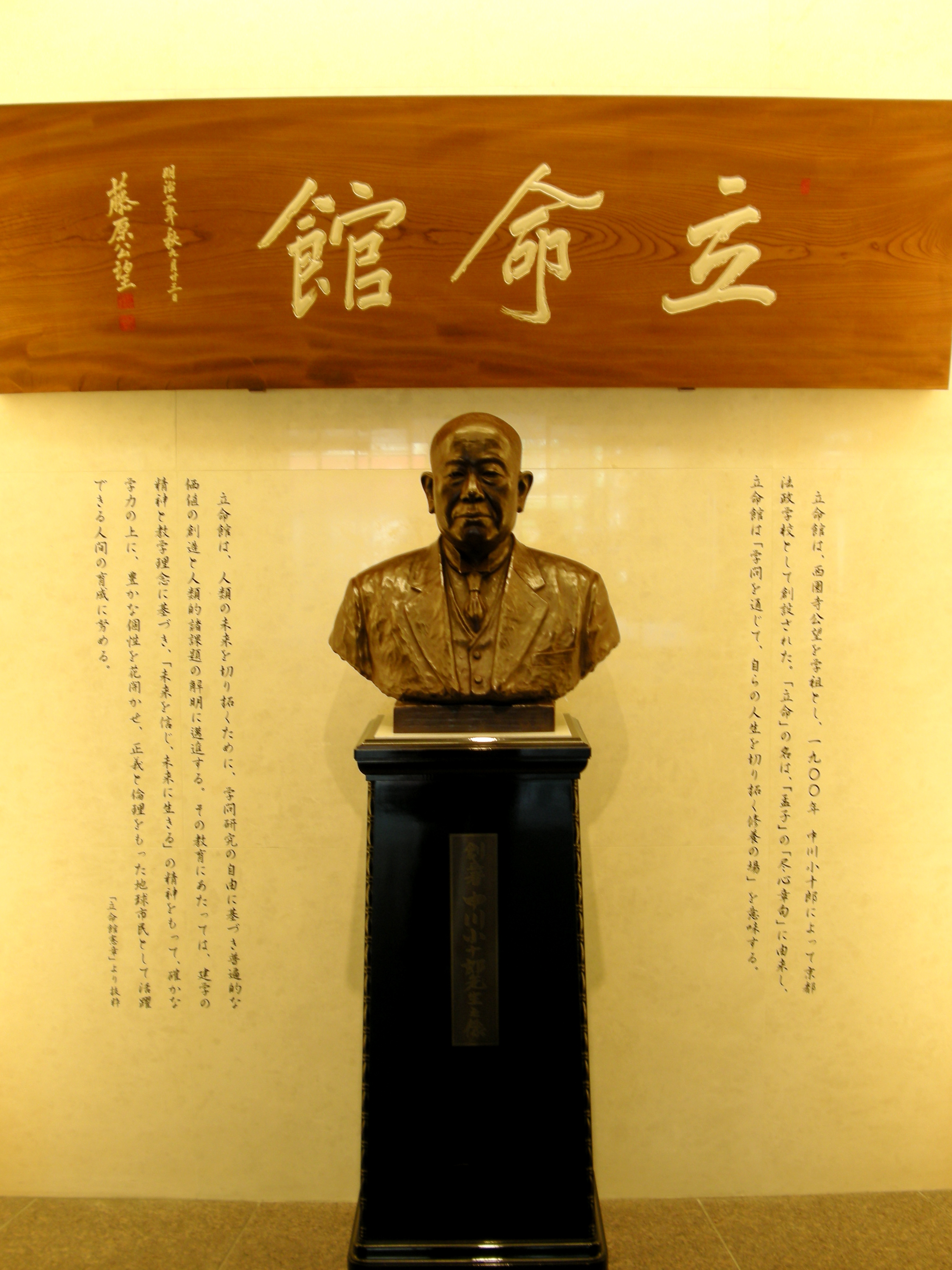
Bust of Kojuro Nakagawa

Ritsumeikan was first founded as a private academy in 1869 by Prince Saionji Kinmochi. In 1900, Kojuro Nakagawa (the former secretary of Prince Saionji) established the Kyoto Hosei School, a law school that eventually adopted the Ritsumeikan name (with the prince's permission) and was awarded full university status in 1922. Historically, the school was seen as a liberal alternative to the state-run Kyoto University.

The name "Ritsumeikan" comes from a Mencius quotation (Note: The first passage of Mencius' Jin Xin I.):

Some die young, as some live long lives. This is decided by fate. Therefore, one's duty consists of cultivating one's mind during this mortal span and thereby "establishing one's destiny". (in Japanese, 立命, ritsumei)

The "kan" in addition to "ritsumei" signifies a building.

== Colleges and graduate schools (by campus) ==
=== Kinugasa Campus (KIC) ===
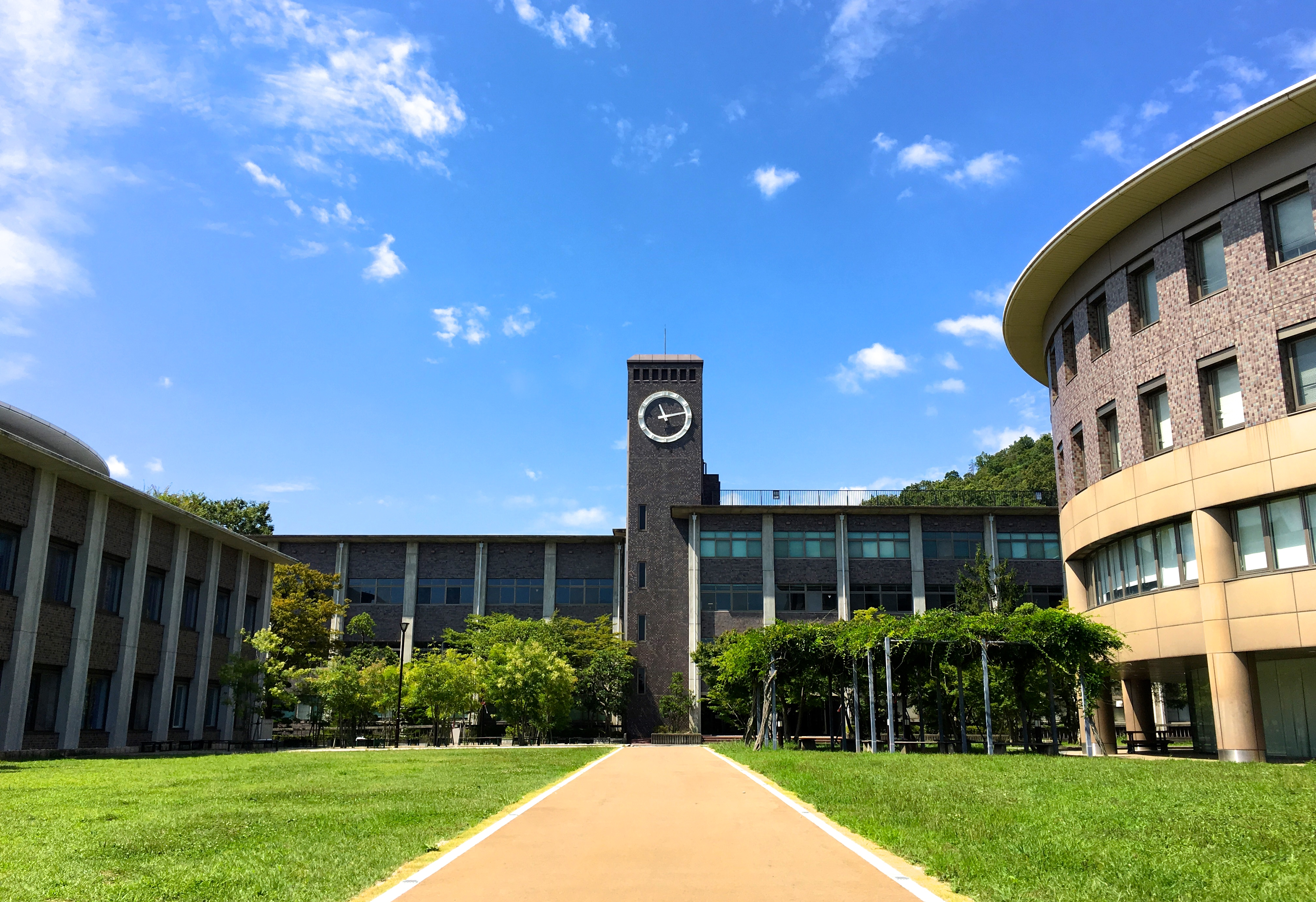
Zonshinkan is a building on the Kinugasa Campus.

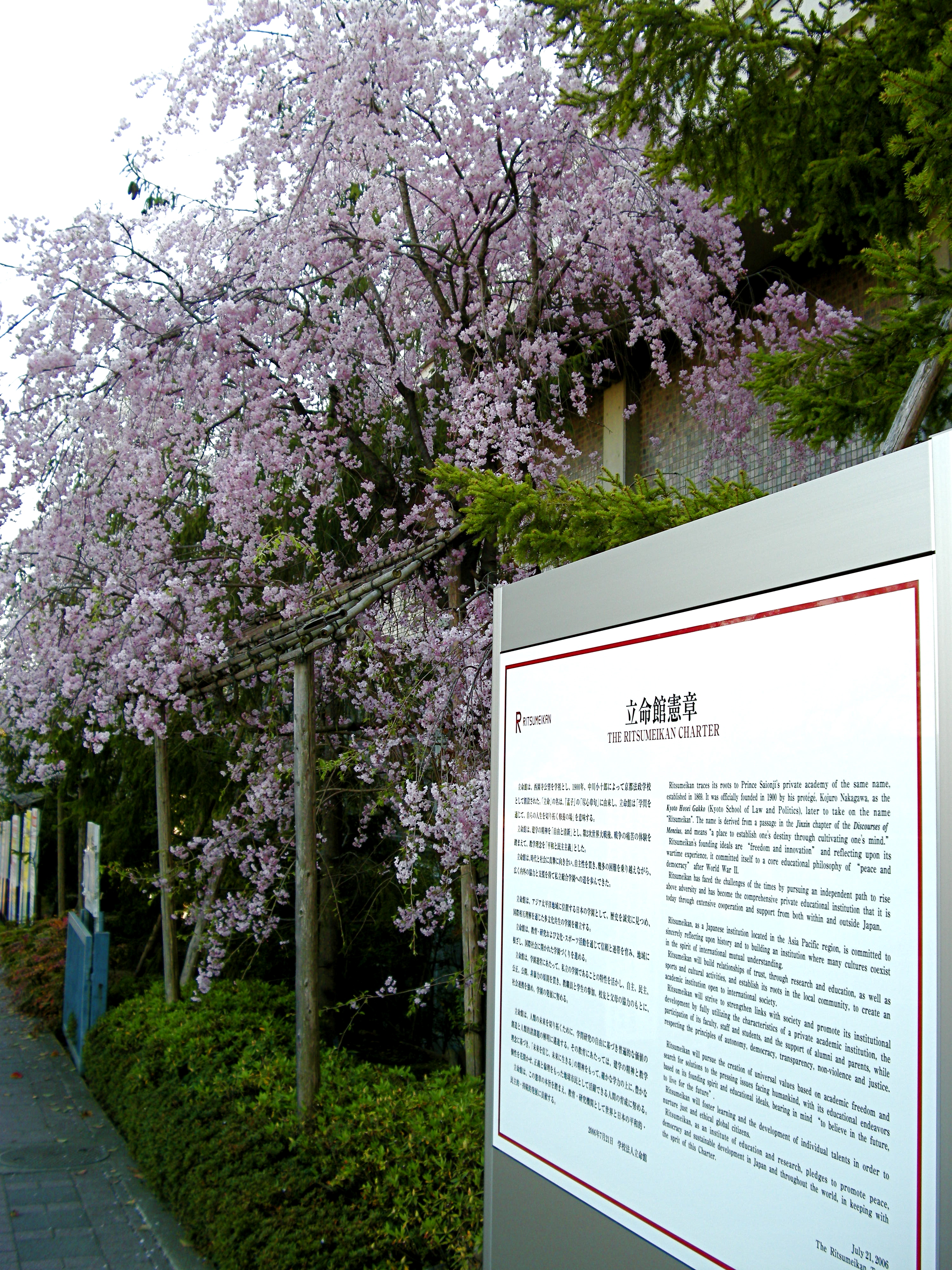
The Ritsumeikan Charter

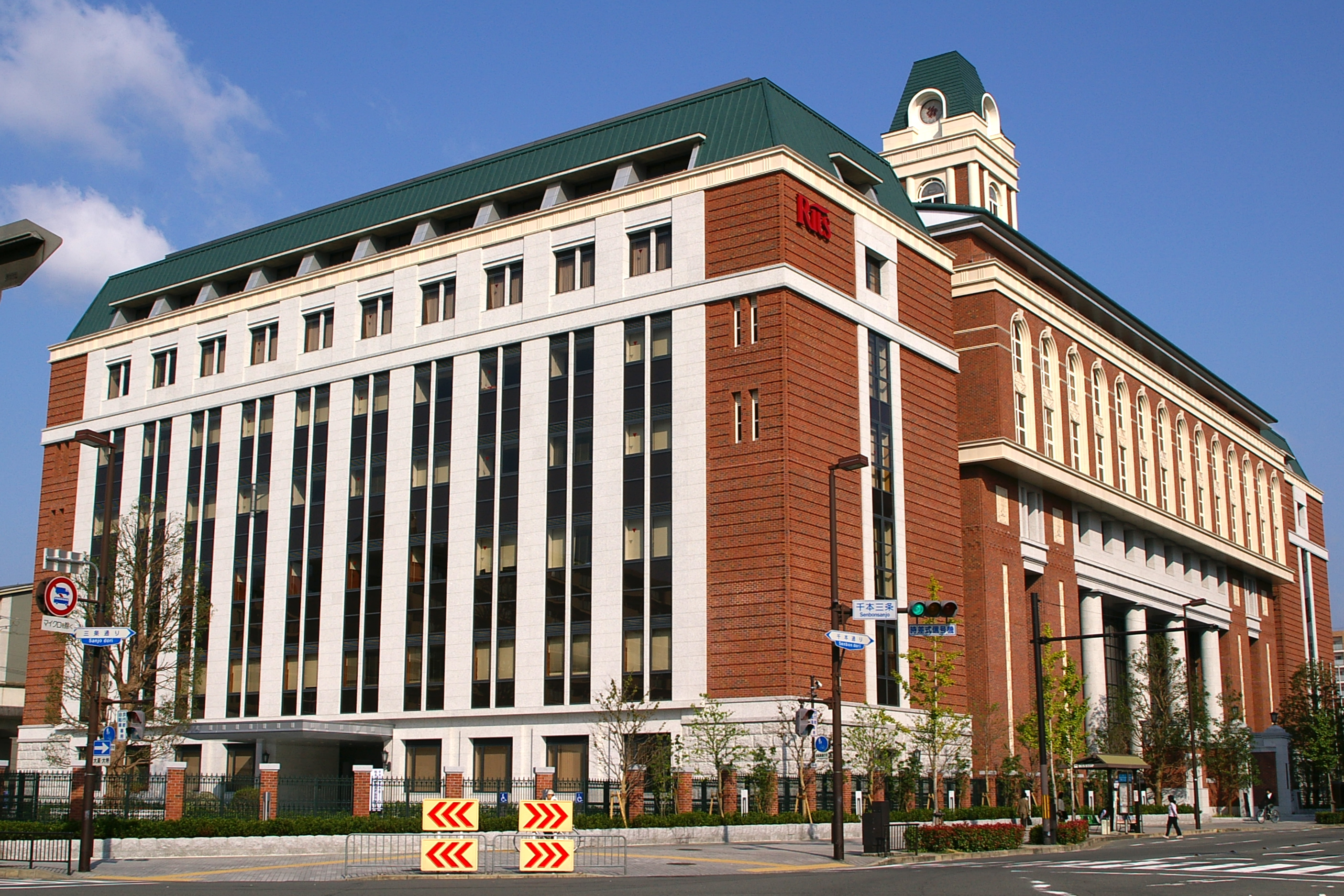
Nakagawa Kaikan building on the Suzaku Campus

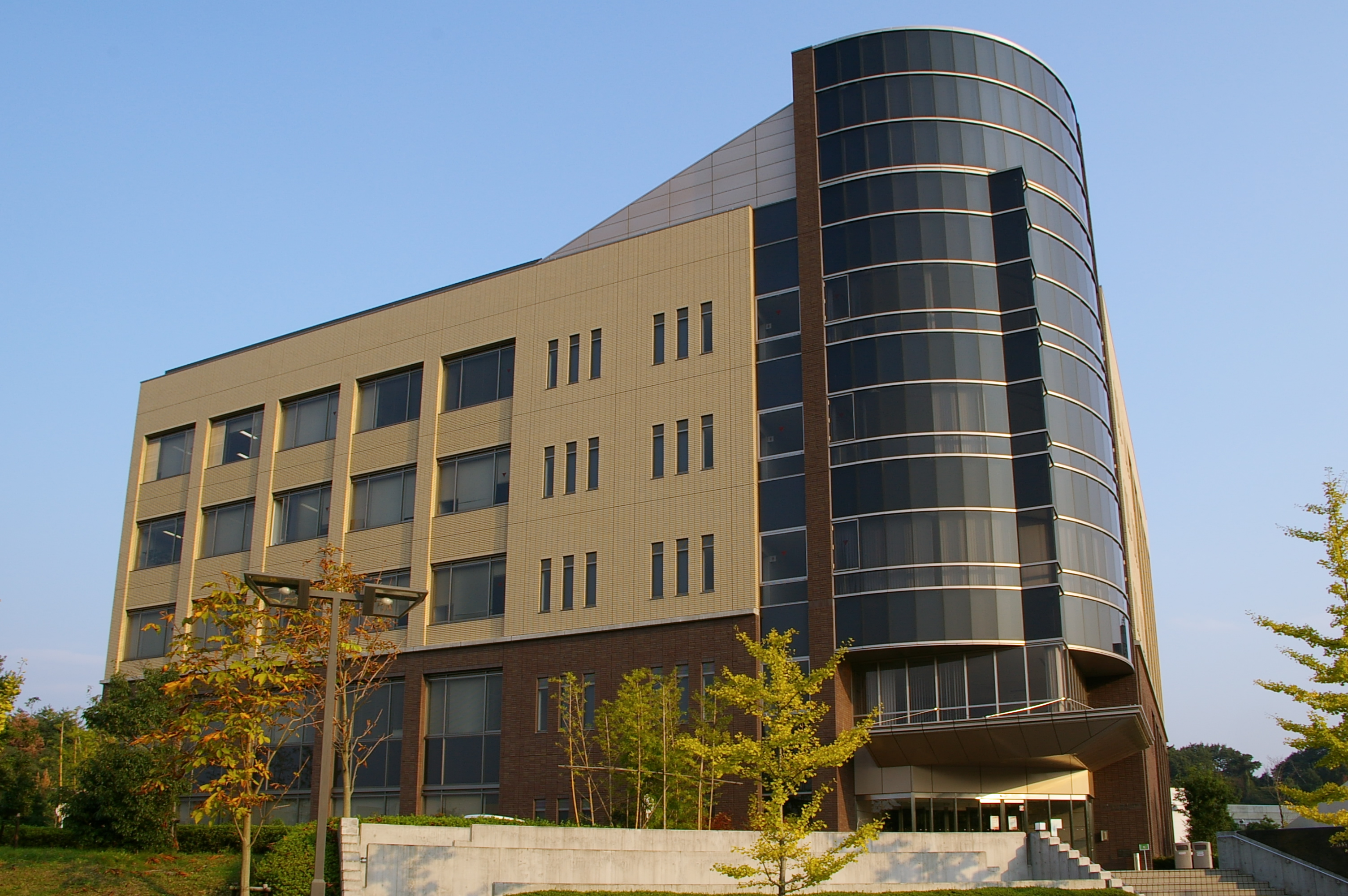
Rohm Plaza of Biwako Kusatsu Campus

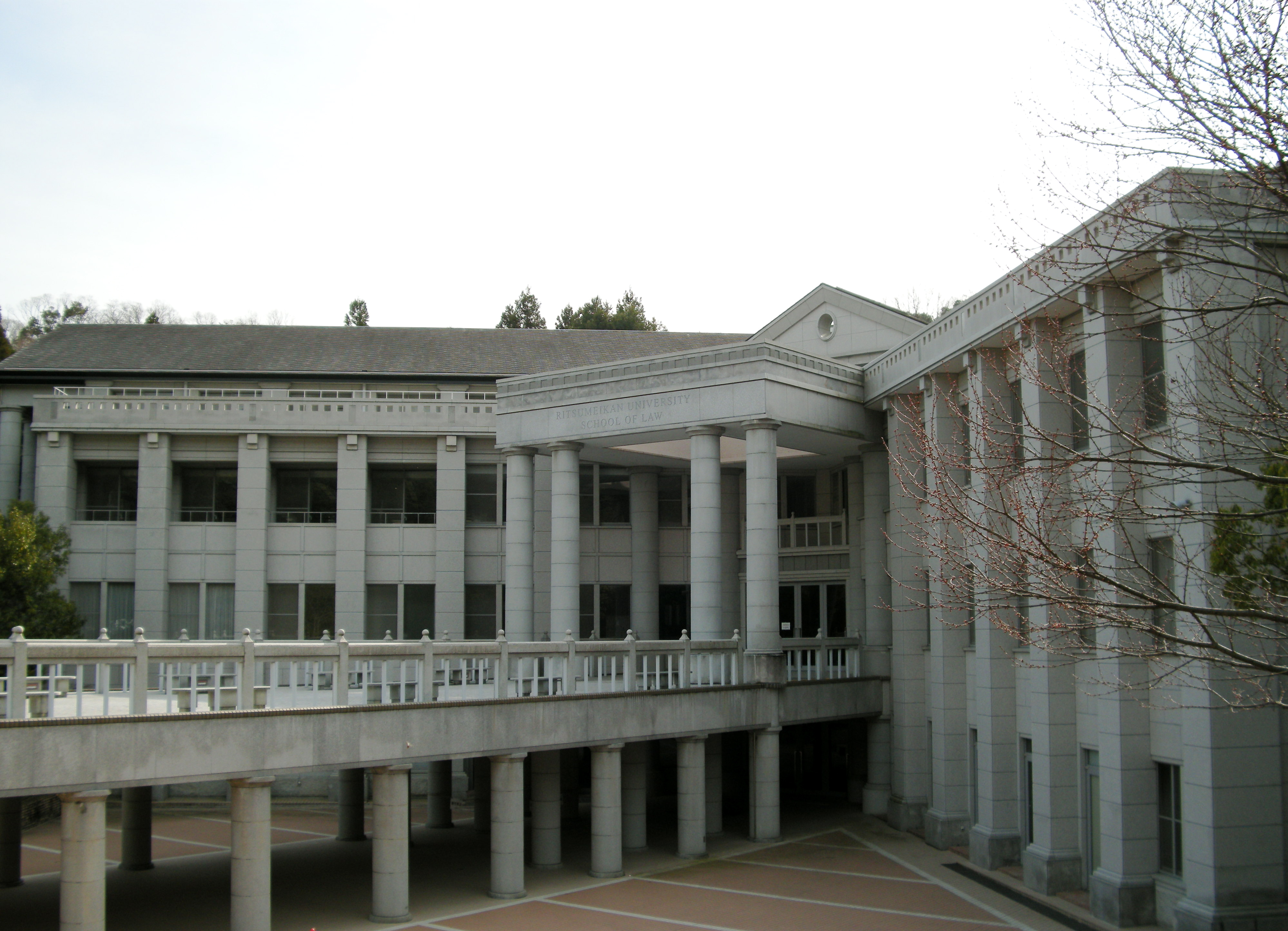
Saionji Memorial Hall (Kinugasa Campus, Kyoto, Japan)

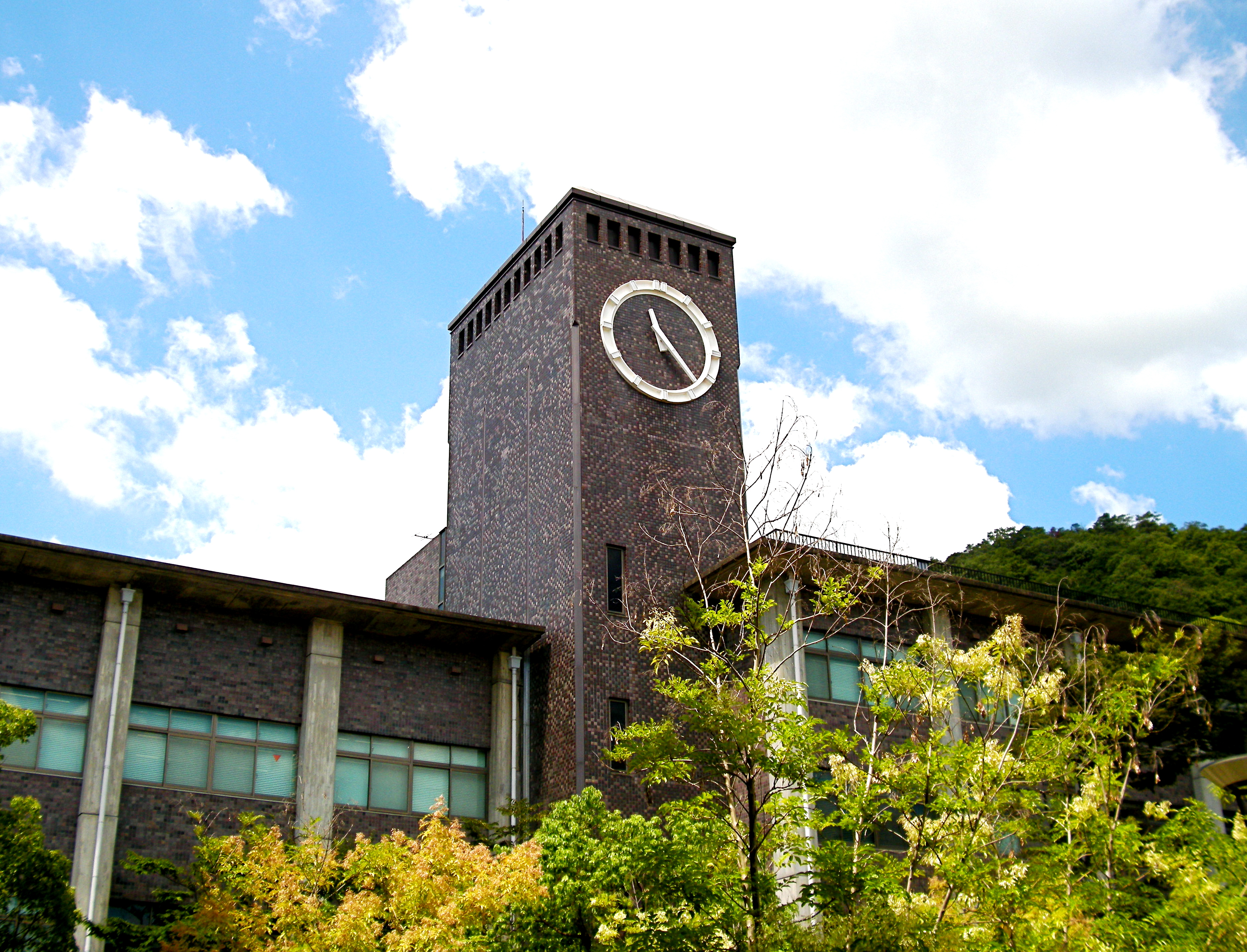
Zonshinkan Hall (Kinugasa Campus, Kyoto, Japan)

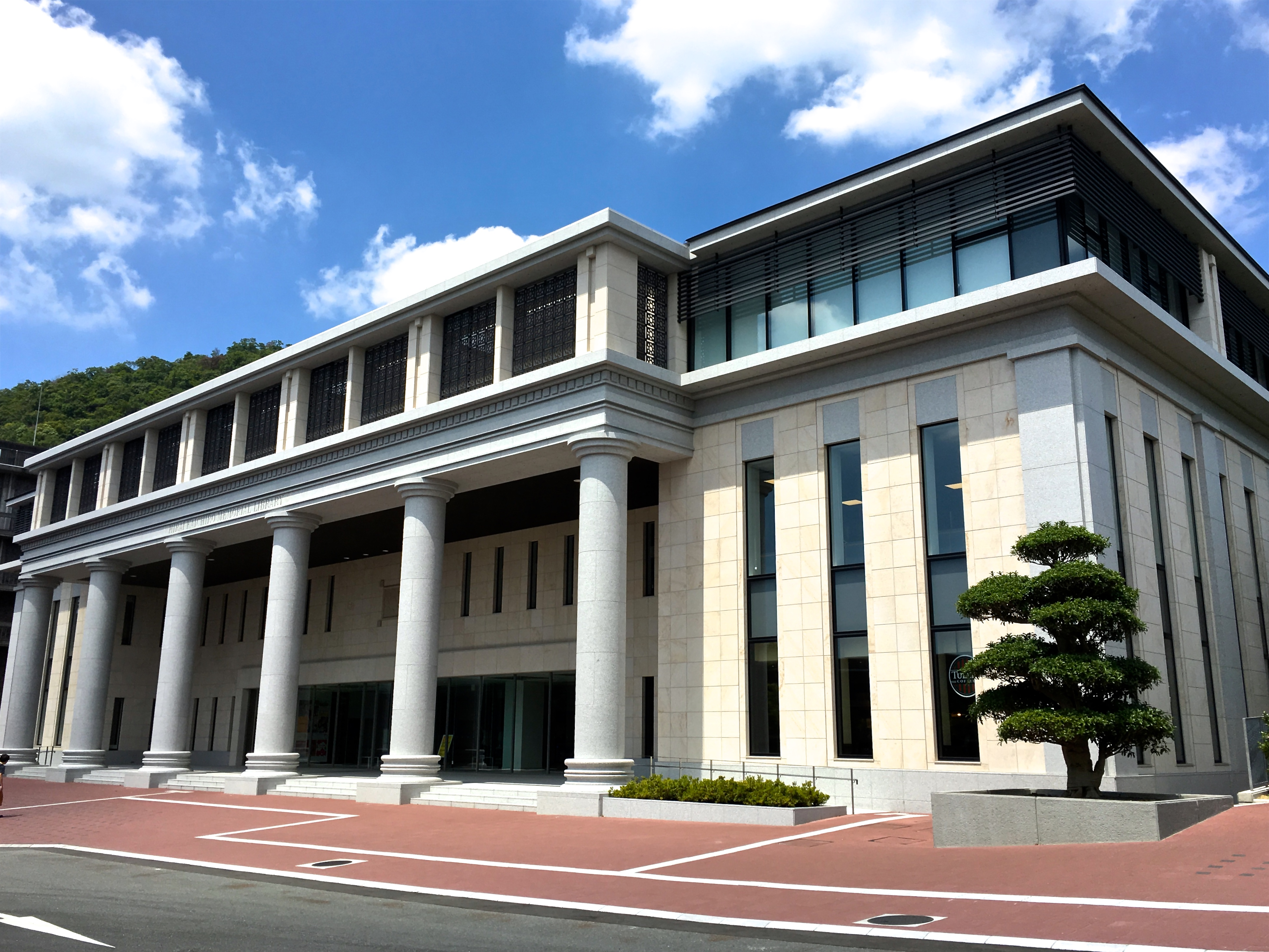
Hirai Kaichiro Memorial Library

In Kita-ku, Kyoto, this liberal arts-oriented campus is a roughly five-minute walk from Ryōan-ji and Kinkaku-ji temples. The campus has eight graduate schools, 17,000 undergraduate and 1,100 graduate students. The overall design of the Kinugasa Campus is by Hiroyasu Tomiie, who was a leading Japanese modernist architect.

- Colleges (学部)
  - College of Law (法学部)
  - College of Social Sciences (産業社会学部)
  - College of International Relations (国際関係学部)
  - College of Letters (文学部)
- Graduate Schools (大学院)
  - Graduate School of Law (法学研究科)
  - Graduate School of Sociology (社会学研究科)
  - Graduate School of International Relations (国際関係研究科)
  - Graduate School of Letters (文学研究科)
  - Graduate School of Language Education and Information Science (言語教育情報研究科)
  - Graduate School of CoreEthics and Frontier Sciences (先端総合学術研究科)
- Institute at Kinugasa Campus (インスティテュート)
  - Inter-faculty Institute for International Studies (国際インスティテュート)
    - International Law & Business Program (国際法務プログラム)
    - International Civil Service Program (国際公共プログラム)
    - International Community Program (国際社会プログラム)
    - International Welfare Program (国際福祉プログラム)

=== Suzaku Campus ===
In Nakagyō-ku, Kyoto. This campus houses the School of Law, Graduate School of Management, and Graduate School of Public Policy, in addition to the Ritsumeikan Academy headquarters.

- Graduate Schools (大学院)
  - Graduate School of Public Policy (公務研究科)
- Schools (専門職大学院)
  - School of Law (法務研究科)

=== Biwako-Kusatsu Campus (BKC) ===
Biwako-Kusatsu Campus is in Kusatsu, Shiga. This technology-oriented campus is southeast of Lake Biwa, the largest freshwater lake in Japan, and is a 30-minute train ride from Kyōto Station. The campus has four undergraduate colleges, four graduate schools, 16,000 undergraduates and 1,600 graduate students.

- Colleges (学部)
  - College of Economics (経済学部) The College of Economics offers three programs pertaining to Economic Strategy, Economic Cooperation and International Economics, and Human Welfare and Economic Conditions. The curriculum integrates theory, history, and knowledge of the current state of affairs in a structured approach on a domestic and foreign scale.
  - College of Science and Engineering (理工学部)
  - Integrated Institute of Arts & Science (文理総合インスティテュート)
  - College of Life Sciences (生命科学部)
  - College of Pharmaceutical Sciences (薬学部)
- Graduate Schools (大学院)
  - Graduate School of Economics (経済学研究科)
  - Graduate School of Science and Engineering (理工学研究科)
- Institute at BKC (インスティテュート)
  - Integrated Institute for Arts and Science
    - Environment & Design Institute (環境・デザインインスティテュート)
    - Finance Institute (ファイナンス・情報インスティテュート)
    - Service Management Institute (サービス・マネジメントインスティテュート)

=== Osaka-Ibaraki Campus (OIC) ===
- Colleges
  - College of Business Administration (経営学部)
  - College of Policy Science (政策科学部)
  - College of Comprehensive Psychology (総合心理学部)
  - College of Global Liberal Arts (国際教養学部)
  - College of Image Arts and Sciences (映像学部)
  - College of Information Science & Engineering (情報理工学部)
- Graduate Schools (大学院)
  - Graduate School of Business Administration (経営学研究科)
  - Graduate School of Policy Science (政策科学研究科)
  - Graduate School of Technology Management (テクノロジー・マネジメント研究科)
  - Graduate School of Management (経営管理研究科)
  - Graduate School of Human Science (人間科学研究科)

=== Osaka-Umeda Campus ===
- Graduate Schools for working adults (社会人大学院)
  - Graduate School of Management (経営管理研究科)
  - Graduate School of Technology Management (テクノロジー・マネジメント研究科)
  - Graduate School of Language Education and Information Science (言語教育情報研究科)

=== Tokyo Campus ===
This campus does not have a college or graduate school, but is used to support students' job searches and other activities.

== Athletics ==
=== American Football ===
The university has supported an American football rules team since 1953. The team has won three national championships, seven collegiate championships, and nine conference championships.

== Academics ==
=== Institutes ===
Ritsumeikan University has 4 research organizations and research institutes in many fields.

- Ritsumeikan Asia-Japan Research Organization
  - Asia-Japan Research Institute
- Kinugasa Research Organization
  - Institute of Humanities, Human and Social Sciences
  - Institute of International Relations and Area Studies
  - International Institute of Language and Culture Studies
  - Institute of Human Sciences
  - Institute of Disaster Mitigation for Urban Cultural Heritage
  - The Shirakawa Shizuka Institute of East Asian Characters and Culture
  - Institute of Ars Vivendi
- BKC Research Organization of Social Sciences
  - Institute of Social Systems
- Research Organization of Science and Technology
  - Institute of Science and Engineering
- Research Organization of Open Innovation and Collaboration
  - The Research and Development Institute of Regional Information

=== Facilities ===
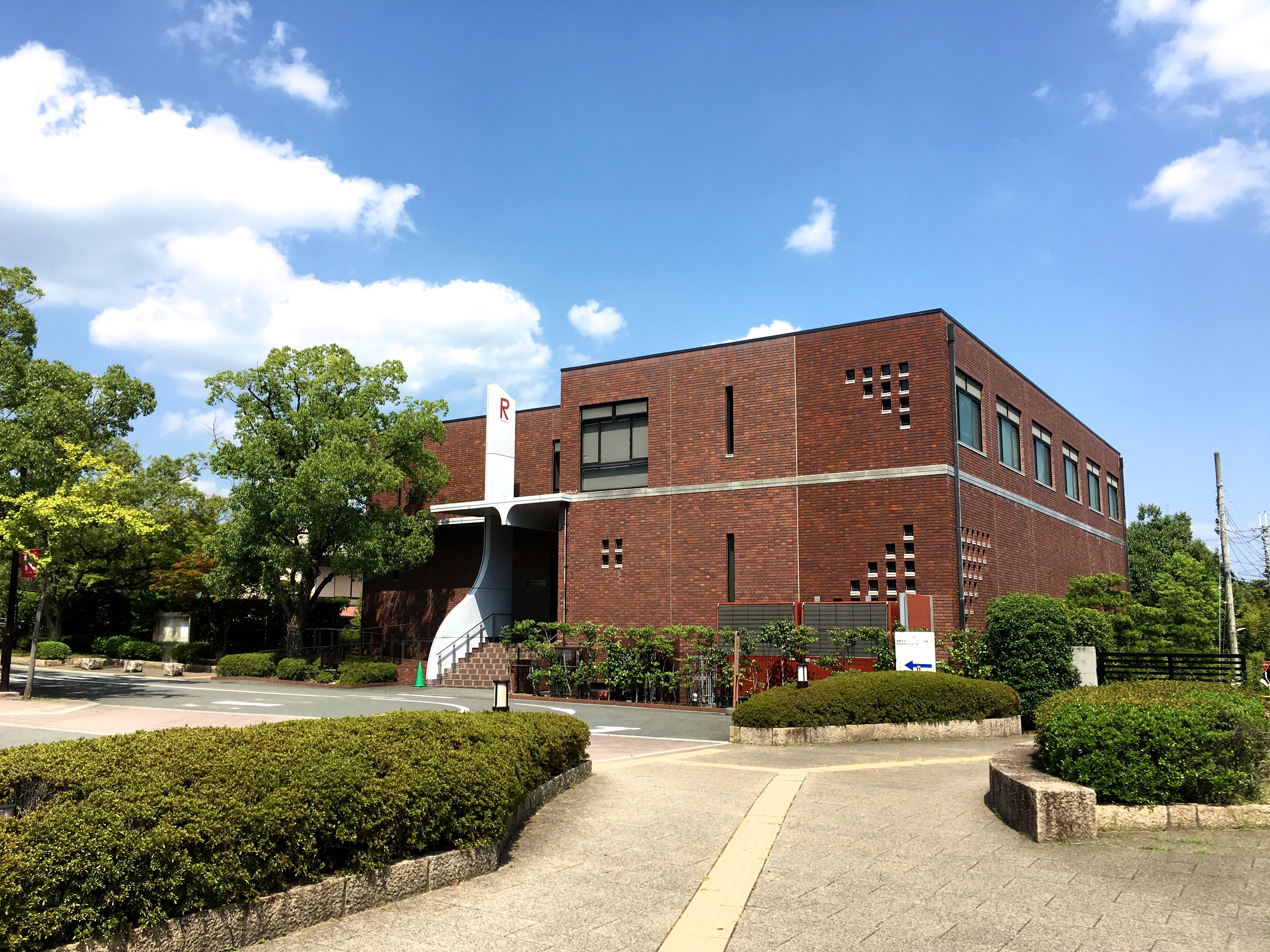
Art Research Center (Kinugasa Campus)

==== Research Center for Disaster Mitigation Systems ====
Established in April 2005 on the Biwako-Kusatsu Campus, work at this center focuses on disaster mitigation using sensor systems and computer networks.

==== Art Research Center ====
Located at Kinugasa Campus, this center houses the Digital Humanities Center for Japanese Arts and Cultures, which focuses on research on Japanese art and culture using digital archives, databases, and geographical information systems.

==== Museums ====
The Kyoto Museum for World Peace seeks to critically examine Japan's militaristic past and includes numerous exhibits ranging from the Sino-Japanese War of 1894–1895 to the Iraq War.

==== SR center ====
Located at BKC campus, this center is established for research using Synchrotron Radiation.

=== International education ===
The university is one of the universities making progress in internationalization efforts and has been designated as one of the top global universities by the Ministry of Education, Culture, Sports, Science, and Technology. Ritsumeikan University has exchange programs with schools throughout the world, including the University of British Columbia, the University of Melbourne, the University of Sydney, the University of Hong Kong, King's College London and the University of Manchester. Ritsumeikan also currently offers a dual bachelor's degree program and dual master's degree program in collaboration with American University and Australian National University. Nearly 1,800 Ritsumeikan students study abroad, while Ristumeikan accepts nearly 2,500 international students every year.

=== Academic rankings ===
In the 2024 edition of the QS World University Rankings, it is ranked 631st-640th. Ranked 4th among private universities in Japan. In the 2023 edition QS Asia University Rankings, it was ranked 126th. Ranked 3rd among private universities in Japan. In the 2022 edition of the QS Graduate Employability Rankings, it ranked 201st-250th. It ranked 1st among private universities in Western Japan in the three rankings mentioned above.

University rankings

Global – Overall
- QS World: =680 (2026)

Regional – Overall
- QS Asia: =144 (2025)

In the 2023 edition of THE World University Rankings Japan, it is ranked 31st. Ranked 11th among Western Japan universities and 1st among Kinki private universities. In the same year edition of THE World University Rankings, it ranked 1201st-1500th, and in THE Asia University Rankings ranked 401st-500th.

In the 2023 edition of CWUR World University Rankings, it is ranked 1024th, in the top 5% of the world.

== Notable alumni ==
Notable people affiliated with Ritsumeikan University, including graduates, former students, and professors:

- Momofuku Ando (1934 College of Economics), founder of Nissin Food Products Co., Ltd. who invented the world's first instant noodles and cup noodles.
- Shinzo Watanabe mathematics professor, the fundamental contributor to the field of probability theory, and stochastic analysis.
- Kenichirou Satou CEO of Rohm
- Den Kawakatsu former CEO of Nankai Electric Railway
- Takashi Haga former chairman and executive director of Marudai Food
- Shinichiro Furumoto (1987 College of Law), a member of the House of Representatives
- Kenta Izumi (1998 College of Law), a member of the House of Representatives and leader of CDP
- Tadayoshi Ichida (1967 College of Law), a member of the House of Councillors
- Hiroshi Okada (1969 College of Social Sciences), a member of the House of Councillors
- Atsuya Furuta (1988 College of Business Administration), Nippon Professional Baseball player (Tokyo Yakult Swallows)
- Cico (College of International Relations), singer and half of Bennie K
- Shigetoshi Hasegawa (1990 College of Social Sciences), MLB player
- Masafumi Kawaguchi (1996 College of International Relations), American football player
- Noriaki Kinoshita (College of Business Administration), American football player
- Hiyori Kon, female sumo wrestler
- Rikiya Koyama (College of Law), actor
- Mohammad Saifullah Ozaki, 1st Emir of Islamic State - Bengal Province
- Daisuke Matsui (College of Business Administration), soccer player
- Tsutomu Minakami, novelist, Naoki Prize winner
- Masayuki Nagare, artist
- Hiroyuki Nagato, actor
- Gorō Naya, actor
- Rokuro Naya (College of Law), actor
- Isin Nisio, novelist
- Tomokazu Ohka (College of Business Administration), MLB player
- Quruli, Japanese music group
- Masumi Yagi and Shigeo Takahashi, comedic duo
- Mai Kuraki (College of Social Sciences, 2005), singer
- Hiroshi Tanahashi, professional wrestler
- Tomoaki Taniguchi, Japan rugby player
- Yuji Ijiri, accounting professor
- Princess Raiyah of Jordan
- Tomotaka Takahashi, robot creator
- Akira Machida, archaeologist
- Yamaguchi Gogen (College of Law), karate master
- Suh Sung, professor and writer
- Otoboke Beaver, punk band
- Mike Bellot, Haitian entrepreneur
- Toshiya Kakiuchi, businessman
- Kazutoshi Iida, game developer and designer of Doshin the Giant

== Unions ==
Some staff at Ritsumeikan University are represented by the General Union, a member of the National Union of General Workers (NUGW), which is itself a member of the National Trade Union Council (Zenrokyo).

== See also ==
- Minoru Kitamura
- Ritsumeikan Uji Junior and Senior High School
