= Tabletop game =

Social activity played on a flat surface

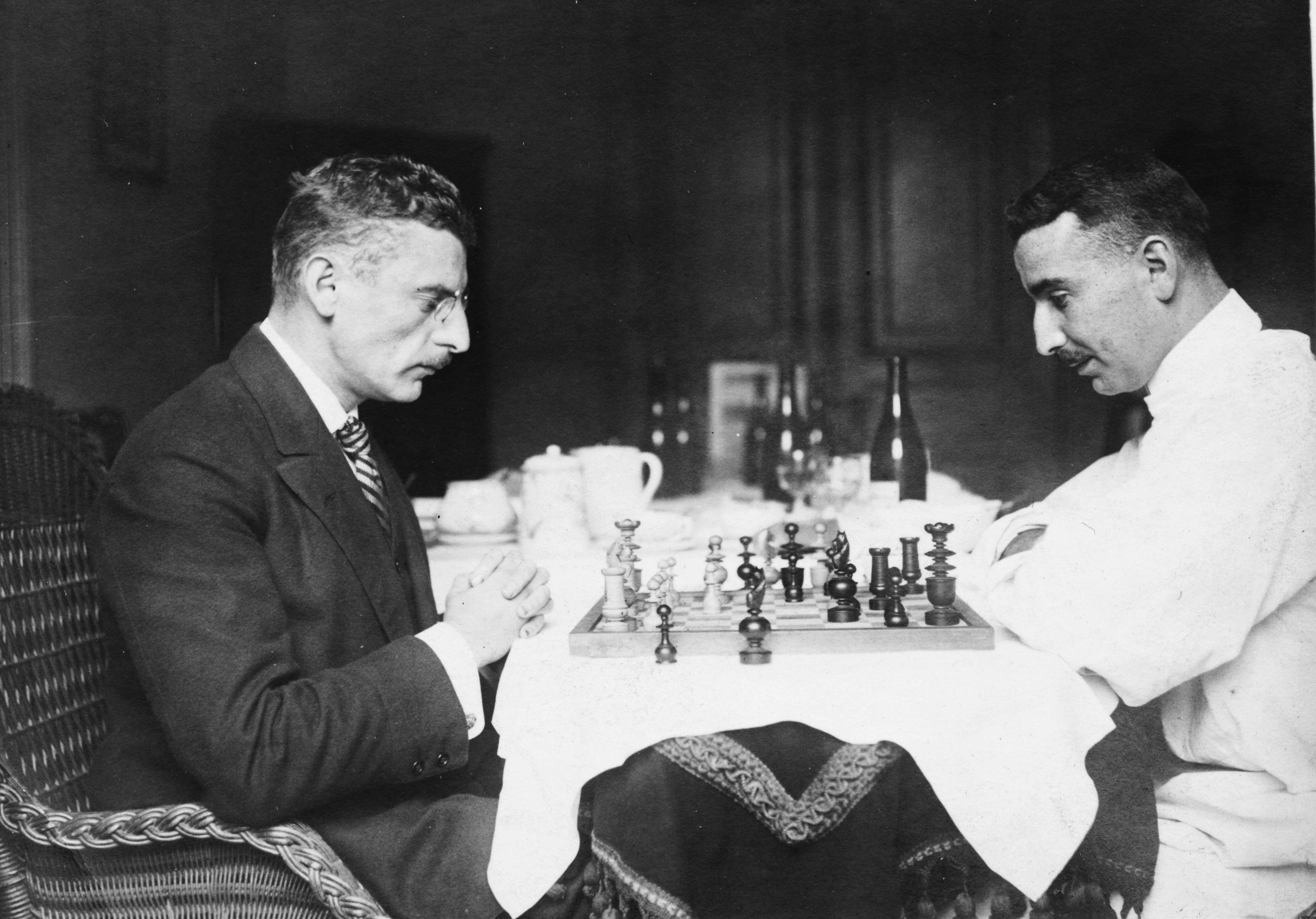
Chess and its relatives have been popular for centuries.

Tabletop games or tabletops are games that are normally played on a table or other flat surface. Examples include board games, card games, dice games, miniature wargames, tabletop role-playing games, or tile-based games.

== Classifications ==
=== Classification according to components used ===
Tabletop games can be classified according to the general form, or components utilized:

Game category	Examples
Board	Adventure board games, adventure gamebooks, backgammon, chess, German-style board games, go, reversi, Mancala, Shogi, Gomoku, Four-in-a-row (or Yonmoku), Tic-tac-toe (or Sanmoku, Three-in-a-row)
Card	solitaire, collectible card games, hanafuda, tarot card games, poker
Dexterity	Jenga, Crokinole, Klask, Hungry Hungry Hippos, Loopin' Louie, Terror in Meeple City, Don't Break the Ice, Crossbows and Catapults, Knucklebones, PitchCar
Dice	bunco, craps, poker dice, sic bo, yahtzee
Paper and pencil	Battleship, Connect 5, dots and boxes, hangman, sprouts, sudoku
Tabletop role-playing	Dungeons & Dragons, Pathfinder Roleplaying Game, List of tabletop role-playing games
Strategy	wargames, government simulation games, miniatures games
Tile based	15 puzzle, anagrams, dominoes, mahjong, mahjong solitaire
Tabletop sports	See article.

Games like chess and draughts are examples of games belonging to the board game category. Other games, however, use various attributes and cannot be classified unambiguously (e.g. Monopoly and many modern eurogames utilize a board as well as dice and cards).

For several of these categories there are sub-categories and even sub-sub-categories or genres. For instance, German-style board games, board wargames, and roll-and-move games are all types of board games that differ markedly in style and general interest.

==== Tabletop game components ====
The various specialized parts, pieces, and tools used for playing tabletop games may include:

- Stopwatch, clock, hourglass or egg timer
- Meeples, Miniature figures, pawn, or playing piece
- Gambling chips or play money
- Game board
- Game box or container
- Scoreboard or paper pad
- Cardboard Counter, Dial Counter, Marker or peg for keeping score/tally
- Pencil
- Rule manuals
- Ruler or measuring device
- Modelling clay
- Gamemaster's screen
- Bowls, trays, or component organizers
- Stickers often used in Legacy games
- Card sleeves used in games that have a "Card Crafting System"
- Randomizers such as:
  - Coins
  - Dice, which can include polyhedral dice
  - Dice tower or Dice cup
  - Playing cards, which can be collectible cards
  - Shuffling machine
  - Tiles
  - Tops, such as Teetotums or Dreidels
  - Drawstring bag
  - Spinners
  - Bones, Cowrie Shells, or Stick dice, used in ancient games

A refereed game could also include various aids to play, including scenario packs and computer game aids. Role-playing games can include campaign settings and various supplementary manuals and notes.

=== Classification according to elements of chance ===
Alternatively to being classified by components, they can also be classified by their elements of chance. In game theory, two fundamentally different elements of chance can play a role:

- Chance created by random factors, such as dice rolls or shuffled cards, making a non-deterministic game (also referred to as a stochastic game). In contrast, games that lack this randomness are referred to as deterministic games.
- Chance created by hiding information to only some players that could otherwise impact how a player acts, such as other player's hands from players, making a game with imperfect information. Games with perfect information, on the other hand, do not hide information from the players.
  - Additionally, some games can give select players perfect information, while others are only left with imperfect information

Examples of the chance classification for some well-known tabletop games are given in the table below.

	Full/perfect information	Partial/imperfect information
Deterministic	Abalone; Chess; Domineering; Dots and boxes; Draughts; Go; Gomoku; Hex; Lines of Action; Mancala; Nine men's morris; Phutball; Reversi; Shogi; Xiangqi	Battleship; Block Dominoes; Cartographers (board game); Contract bridge; Computer Klondike which allow reset of the initial game state (Note: distinction for reset is important, otherwise the transitional state outcomes becomes probabilistic like poker and blackjack, and therefore stochastic); Liar's Dice; "Scratchees" from Decipher, Inc.; Stratego
Stochastic	Backgammon; Craps; Parcheesi; Pig; Roulette; Scribbage; Yahtzee	Blackjack; Canasta; Gin rummy; Imperial Twing; Mahjong; Monopoly; Poker; Risk; Scrabble

== Organizations ==
List of organizations that sponsor events featuring tabletop games:

- Board Game Geek organizes BGG.CON
- PAX hosts PAX Unplugged
- Geek & Sundry promotes an annual International TableTop Day
- The Organization of Gamers & Roleplaying Enthusiasts (O.G.R.E.s) organizes tabletop events for OMGcon
- White Wolf Publishing's Camarilla
- Wizards of the Coast own RPGA
- The Historical Miniatures Gaming Society promotes historical miniatures wargaming and organizes wargaming events such as Historicon
- SaltCON LLC organizes SaltCON and the Ion Award competition for unpublished tabletop games

Additionally, numerous independent, local groups run by gamers exist to play tabletop games. Many colleges also have student-run organizations pertaining solely to tabletop gaming, the Collegiate Association of Table Top Gamers being one that has a chapter at various schools.

== Digital tabletop games ==
Digital tabletops games are digital variations of tabletop games, which include straight reproductions of existing physical tabletop games, video games that use tabletop game principles as part of their gameplay mechanics, and tabletop simulators that provide a virtual tabletop for conducting tabletop games online.

== See also ==
- History of games
