= Pan =

Pan or PAN may refer to:

== Common meanings ==
- Pan (cooking), a piece of cooking equipment
  - Frying pan, a type of cooking pan
  - Saucepan, a type of cooking pan
  - Sauté pan, a type of cooking pan
- Pan (god), a Greek deity, often depicted with specific goat features
- Panning (camera), a film and photography technique
- Panning (criticism), severe negative film criticism

== Arts, entertainment and media ==
=== Card games ===
- Pan (game), a shedding card game of Polish origin
- Panguingue or pan, a gambling card game

=== Fictional characters ===
- Pan (Dragon Ball), in Dragon Ball media
- Peter Pan (character), created by James Barrie
- Pan Yinhu, a character in the video game Zenless Zone Zero

=== Films ===
- Pan (1922 film), a Norwegian film
- Pan (1995 film), a Danish/Norwegian/German film
- Pan (2015 film), an American fantasy film

=== Literature and publishing ===
- Pan (Hamsun novel), by Knut Hamsun. 1894
- Pan (Clune novel), by Michael Clune. 2025
- Pan (magazine), an arts and literary review
- Pan Books, a publisher

=== Music ===
==== Musical instruments ====
- Steelpan or pan, an acoustic instrument
- Pan flute or pan pipes

==== Groups and labels ====
- Pan (band), a Filipino folk/punk rock band
- PAN (record label), a record label and art platform
- Pan, a Turkish band which performed "Bana Bana" at the 1989 Eurovision Song Contest

==== Works ====
- Pan (The Blue Hearts), an album by the Japanese band
- Pan, an opera by Carl Venth

=== Sculpture ===
- Pan (Riccio), a 1510s bronze sculpture by Andrea Riccio
- Pan (White), a public artwork by Roger White, in Indianapolis, Indiana, US

== Food ==
- Harina P.A.N., a pre-cooked corn meal
- Paan or pan, a North Indian term for betel

== Languages ==
- Proto-Austronesian language (PAN or PAn), a proto-language
- Punjabi language (ISO 639-3 code: pan)

== Organizations ==
=== Political parties ===
- National Action Party (El Salvador) (Partido Acción Nacional) of El Salvador
- National Action Party (Mexico) (Partido Acción Nacional) of Mexico
- National Action Party (Nicaragua) (Partido Acción Nacional) of Nicaragua
- National Advancement Party (Partido de Avanzada Nacional) of Guatemala
- National Autonomist Party (Partido Autonomista Nacional), historical Argentine party
- National Mandate Party (Partai Amanat Nasional) of Indonesia
- Party of the Nation's Retirees (Partido dos Aposentados da Nação) of Brazil
- People Animals Nature (Pessoas-Animais-Natureza) of Portugal

=== Other organizations ===
- PAN (record label), a record label and art platform
- Pan Books, a publisher
- Banco Pan, a Brazilian midsize commercial bank
- Pan Club Copenhagen, a gay club
- Palo Alto Networks, an American cybersecurity company
- Pesticide Action Network, an international NGO network
- Polish Academy of Sciences (Polska Akademia Nauk)
- Protect Arizona Now, sponsor of 2004 Arizona Proposition 200

== People and individual animals ==
- Pan (surname) (潘 or 盤), Chinese family name
- Pen Ran (1944–1979), Cambodian singer and songwriter whose name is sometimes Romanized as Pan Ron
- Pan (chimpanzee), a chimp known for his appearance on Japanese variety shows
- Pan (horse), an early 19th century British thoroughbred racehorse and sire

== Science and technology ==
=== Astronomy ===
- Pan (crater), on Jupiter's moon Amalthea
- Carme (moon), of Jupiter, former name Pan (1955–1975)
- Pan (moon), of Saturn
- 4450 Pan, an asteroid

=== Biology and medicine ===
- Pan (genus), which includes bonobos and chimpanzees
- Panoramic radiograph, a panoramic scanning dental X-ray
- Pediatric acute-onset neuropsychiatric syndrome (PANS), a controversial hypothetical diagnosis
- Polyarteritis nodosa, a vasculitic condition
- Positional alcohol nystagmus, eye jerkiness

=== Chemistry ===
- Peroxyacyl nitrates, irritants present in photochemical smog
- Phthalic anhydride, the anhydride of phthalic acid
- Polyacrylonitrile, a polymer of acrylonitrile
- Protactinium nitride (chemical formula PaN)

=== Computing ===
- Pan (newsreader), for Usenet
- Pan (programming language)
- Personal area network

=== Other science and technology ===
- Panning (audio), of a signal into a new sound field
- Flash pan, a small receptacle for priming powder on muzzle-loading firearms
- USA-207, an American satellite also known as PAN (Palladium At Night)
- Dry lake or pan

== Railway stations ==
- Pangbourne railway station (National Rail code: PAN), in Berkshire, UK
- Pancoran LRT station, a light rail station in Jakarta, Indonesia

== Other uses ==
- Gold panning, a mining technique
- Nutrition Assistance for Puerto Rico (Programa de Asistencia Nutricional), a US Federal assistance program
- Pan, Slavic honorifics in Poland and Ukraine
- Pansexuality, a sexual orientation (often known as "pan")
- Panama (ISO 3166-1 alpha-3 code: PAN)
- Bedpan, a device
- Permanent account number, for taxpayers in India and Nepal
- Primary account number, the payment card number of a payment card

== See also ==
- Pan Pan (disambiguation)
- Pan-pan, a radio state of urgency call
