= SaltCON =

- Status: Current
- Genre: Board games/Roleplaying Games/Convention
- Venue: Davis Conference Center / Ruby's Inn
- Location: Layton, Utah / Bryce Canyon, Utah
- Country: United States
- Inaugurated: 2009
- Most recent: Current
- Attendance: 2,500+ (SaltCON Spring 2024)
- Organizer: SaltCON UT LLC
- Website: https://saltcon.com/

SaltCON is a series of annual board game and tabletop RPG events organized by SaltCON UT LLC, recognized as the largest board game and RPG convention series in the Intermountain West. The five core conventions — SaltCON Spring, SaltCON Summer, SaltCON End of Summer, SaltCON Bryce, and SaltCON Bryce Twice — are held at the Davis Conference Center in Layton, Utah and Ruby's Inn in Bryce Canyon, Utah. SaltCON also organizes an annual gaming cruise; the 2026 edition sails to Alaska aboard the Voyager of the Seas in August 2026. The conventions are family friendly and focus on hobby and designer board games, with the mission "to bring people together with games." Unlike many other conventions, the board game halls are open 24 hours, allowing attendees to play throughout the night. SaltCON Spring, the largest of the five events, has grown steadily since its founding, surpassing 1,100 attendees in 2016, 1,900 in 2019, and approximately 2,400 in 2024. SaltCON Summer and End of Summer each draw 1,200+ attendees, while SaltCON Bryce and Bryce Twice are smaller, more intimate events held at Ruby's Inn with 300+ attendees.

== Events ==
=== Featured Events ===
Blood on the Clocktower, a large-group social deduction game, is featured at select SaltCON events. Professional Storytellers from the Las Vegas Board Game Association and the Las Vegas Clocktower Convention host sessions at SaltCON Spring and SaltCON End of Summer, while other events feature local hosts.

SaltCON features a dedicated RPG Room as one of its core programming areas, described by organizers as the largest dedicated area for role-playing systems in the state of Utah. The room uses round tables to support the interactive nature of tabletop role-playing games and hosts a wide variety of systems, including Dungeons & Dragons (Adventurer's League), Pathfinder Second Edition, Call of Cthulhu, and titles from publishers such as Free League Publishing and Modiphius Entertainment. A dedicated prototype table is reserved for new and smaller games from independent and local designers. SaltCON Spring 2026 featured 28 scheduled RPG tables alongside 347 events totaling nearly 1,000 hours of play.

=== General Events ===
Attendees at SaltCON events can enjoy a wide range of activities beyond competitive play. A game library of over 2,600 titles is available for checkout throughout each convention. The conventions feature board game publisher and local exhibitors, game teachers through the Envoy Herald program, Meeple Nation hosted games, and a Live Flea Market and Game Swap Room for buying, selling, and trading games.

Games available span a wide range of types, including strategy, party, card, dice, dexterity, miniature, war, and social deduction games, as well as tabletop RPGs. Miniature painting events, panel discussions, workshops, Play-to-Win Games, and reserved and scheduled gaming tables round out the programming.

=== Game Design ===
SaltCON hosts the Ion Award, a prominent international board game design competition established in 2009 for unpublished game prototypes. Each year, publishers are invited to judge submissions across Strategy and Light categories; notes are collected, tallied, and winners announced at SaltCON Spring. Games that win the Ion Award are frequently picked up for publication. Notable winners and finalists include Nika, Gnome Hollow, Moon Bunny, Steam Up: A Feast of Dim Sum, and Super Truffle Pigs!

SaltCON Spring and SaltCON End of Summer host ProtoCON, a board game prototype showcase organized by the Board Game Designers Guild of Utah, where attendees can meet designers and play games still in development.

=== Competitive Play ===
SaltCON partners with the Double Exposure Envoy program to host official organized play tournaments at multiple events throughout the year. The Utah State Championships are held at SaltCON Bryce, while the Western Regional Championships are held at SaltCON Spring. Both SaltCON Bryce and SaltCON Spring also serve as official U.S. National Championship Qualifiers for select titles through the Envoy program; recent qualifiers have included the Doomlings National Championship Qualifier. In addition to Envoy-organized play, SaltCON Spring features a variety of other tournaments across different game titles.

=== Special Events ===
The following special events are offered at select conventions (noted in parentheses):

- Artemis (Spring) — a multiplayer cooperative spaceship bridge simulation experience
- Math Trade (Spring, End of Summer) — a structured game exchange in which participants trade games using a mathematical matching algorithm
- ProtoCON (Spring, End of Summer) — see Game Design above
- Puzzle Hunt (Spring)
- Hot Games (Spring, Summer, End of Summer) — a curated selection of games SaltCON identifies as noteworthy and likely to generate attendee interest. Dedicated game teachers are available to teach these titles throughout the day. Typically eight different games are featured at each event.

== History ==
The convention began in 2009 as a follow-up to the "A Gathering of Strangers" board game days held at the University of Utah. The first events were held at the University of Utah's Officers Club, but growing attendance led to moves to the Royal Garden Inn in 2012, the Sheraton in 2013, and the Davis Conference Center in Layton since 2014.

Additional events were introduced over time: End of Summer debuted in 2018, Summer in 2019, and SaltCON Bryce at Ruby's Inn in Bryce Canyon in 2022, with SaltCON Bryce Twice added in 2025. The COVID-19 pandemic disrupted programming in 2020 and 2021; while SaltCON Spring 2020 proceeded as scheduled in early March 2020, subsequent events that year were cancelled, and programming remained limited through 2021.

Historical SaltCON events
Year	Dates	Location	Event
2009	July 10–11	University of Utah Officers Club	Main Event
2010	February 26–28	University of Utah Officers Club	Main Event
2011	February 18–19	University of Utah Officers Club	Main Event
2012	February 17–18	Royal Garden Inn	Main Event
2013	February 15–17	Sheraton	Main Event
2014	March 28–30	Davis Conference Center	Main Event
2015	March 12–14	Davis Conference Center	Main Event
2016	March 3–5	Davis Conference Center	Main Event
2017	March 2–5	Davis Conference Center	Main Event
2018	March 1–4	Davis Conference Center	Spring
2018	August 31 – September 1	Davis Conference Center	End of Summer
2019	February 28 – March 3	Davis Conference Center	Spring
2019	May 31 – June 1	Davis Conference Center	Summer
2019	August 30–31	Davis Conference Center	End of Summer
2020	March 5–8	Davis Conference Center	Spring
2020	June 5–6	Davis Conference Center — Cancelled	Summer
2020	August 28–29	Davis Conference Center — Cancelled	End of Summer
2021	March 3–8	Davis Conference Center — Cancelled	Spring
2021	July 30 – August 1	Davis Conference Center	End of Summer
2022	January 14–16	Ruby's Inn	Bryce
2022	March 3–6	Davis Conference Center	Spring
2022	September 2–4	Davis Conference Center	End of Summer
2023	January 13–15	Ruby's Inn	Bryce
2023	March 2–5	Davis Conference Center	Spring
2023	June 2–4	Davis Conference Center	Summer
2023	September 1–3	Davis Conference Center	End of Summer
2024	January 12–14	Ruby's Inn	Bryce
2024	February 29 – March 3	Davis Conference Center	Spring
2024	June 7–9	Davis Conference Center	Summer
2024	August 30 – September 1	Davis Conference Center	End of Summer
2025	January 17–19	Ruby's Inn	Bryce
2025	January 24–26	Ruby's Inn	Bryce Twice
2025	February 27 – March 2	Davis Conference Center	Spring
2025	June 6–8	Davis Conference Center	Summer
2025	August 29–31	Davis Conference Center	End of Summer
2026	January 15–17	Ruby's Inn	Bryce
2026	January 23–25	Ruby's Inn	Bryce Twice
2026	March 12–15	Davis Conference Center	Spring
2026	June 5–7	Davis Conference Center	Summer
2026	September 4–6	Davis Conference Center	End of Summer

== Support for Other Events ==
SaltCON has supported gaming events across Utah and the surrounding region by providing resources including its game library, volunteers, and game teachers.

=== Currently Supported Events ===
- Dragonsteel Nexus — an annual convention in Salt Lake City celebrating the works of author Brandon Sanderson; SaltCON has provided its game library to the event in 2024 and 2025.
- ICON — a board game event in Idaho Falls, Idaho; SaltCON brought games from its library to support the event
- Meeple Treks Board St. George
- TimpCON — a tabletop gaming convention held annually in Provo, Utah

=== Formerly Supported Events ===
- Salt Lake Comic Con — rebranded as FanX Salt Lake
- BryceCON — now continued as SaltCON Bryce, one of SaltCON's own annual events
- International Games Day @ your Library — SaltCON co-sponsored and provided its game library to multiple International Games Day events at Utah libraries between 2013 and 2017
- Salt Lake Quarterly Game Day — permanently discontinued
- International Tabletop Day
- Salt Lake Gaming Con — permanently discontinued
- STGCON — permanently discontinued
- MyCon — permanently discontinued
- DinoCON — permanently discontinued
