= Kurnik =

Kurnik may refer to

- Kurnik (pirog), a type of Russian pirog
- PlayOK, a website of board and card games formerly known as Kurnik
