= The Night Cage =

2021 horror board game

- Designers: Christopher Ryan Chan; Chris McMahon; Rosswell Saunders
- Publishers: Smirk & Laughter Games
- Publication: 2021; 5 years ago
- Genres: Horror game; Cooperative game; Tile-based game
- Players: 1–5
- Playing time: 40–60 minutes
- Age range: 14+

The Night Cage is a tile-based cooperative horror board game designed by Christopher Ryan Chan, Chris McMahon, and Rosswell Saunders and published by Smirk & Laughter Games in 2021.

== Publishing history ==
The Night Cage was funded by a successful Kickstarter campaign from August to July in 2020, and was published for retail in July 2021. An expansion, The Night Cage: Shrieking Hollow, was released in 2024.

== Gameplay ==
All players start with a Player Status card, a Nerve token, a starting Passageway tile, and a player piece. One by one players place their Passageway tile and player token on any space on board. Each player's token "illuminates" one space directly above, below, left, and right of it at all times, meaning additional Passageway tokens are drawn from the candle-shaped Tile Holder and placed on those spaces. Passageway tokens indicate which directions the player can move from them, but some have a secondary ability, such as Crumbling tiles that become dangerous tunnels to other spaces on the board when moved to, Key tiles that allow a player to claim a Key, Gate tiles through which players can escape, and Monster tiles that create a monster which can attack the player.

Each turn, a player may either stay on their space, discard one tile from the Draw Stack token, and gain a Nerve token, or move to a new space. Only one player token can be on a tile at a time. When a player moves, tiles no that are no longer illuminated are removed from the board and new tiles are placed to fill in the newly illuminated spaces. Wax Eaters are a type of monster tile that will simultaneously attack all Passageway tiles connected in a straight line from themselves any time a player moves along, into, or out of one of them. If a player is hit by a Wax Eater, they discard three tiles from the Tile Holder and their Player Status card gets flipped to "Lights Out", meaning they do not illuminate adjacent tiles and must move on their turn. Their Player Status card gets flipped back if that player's token becomes adjacent to a Passageway tile illuminated by another player. A player can spend a Nerve token to gain an advantage for the round, such as an extra turn, discarding less tiles, or staying even if Lights Out.

To escape the Night Cage and win, all players must have a key and gather on a Gate tile. If the Tile Holder runs out of tiles and players have not escaped the Night Cage, then they enter "Final Flickers", meaning no new tiles can be added to the board and an additional illuminated tile from anywhere on the board must be removed when removing un-illuminated tiles after a player moves. If any player cannot escape the Night Cage before all illuminated tiles are removed, then all players lose.

== Reception ==
Wirecutter listed The Night Cage as one of the best horror board games of 2025, praising the game for its simple-to-learn rules, atmospheric artwork, engaging gameplay. Tim Clare, writing for Tabletop Gaming, praised its simple design and fitting artwork, but noted that "the problem with The Night Cage is that you never really have any interesting decisions to make," describing the game as "undeveloped". In an article for Player Elimination, Charlie Theel described the game as "limited", criticizing the game's shallow strategy, and gameplay that is mostly out of players' control and repetitive on repeat plays, ultimately concluding that "it has some novel concepts such as an ever-changing maze and a strong vision of a dwindling candle represented by that exploration stack. But the inventiveness is short-lived and what remains feels very ordinary."

The Night Cage was the winner of the 2019 Light Board Game award at the Ion Awards.
