= Kevin Garn =

American politician (born 1955)

Kevin Stacy Garn
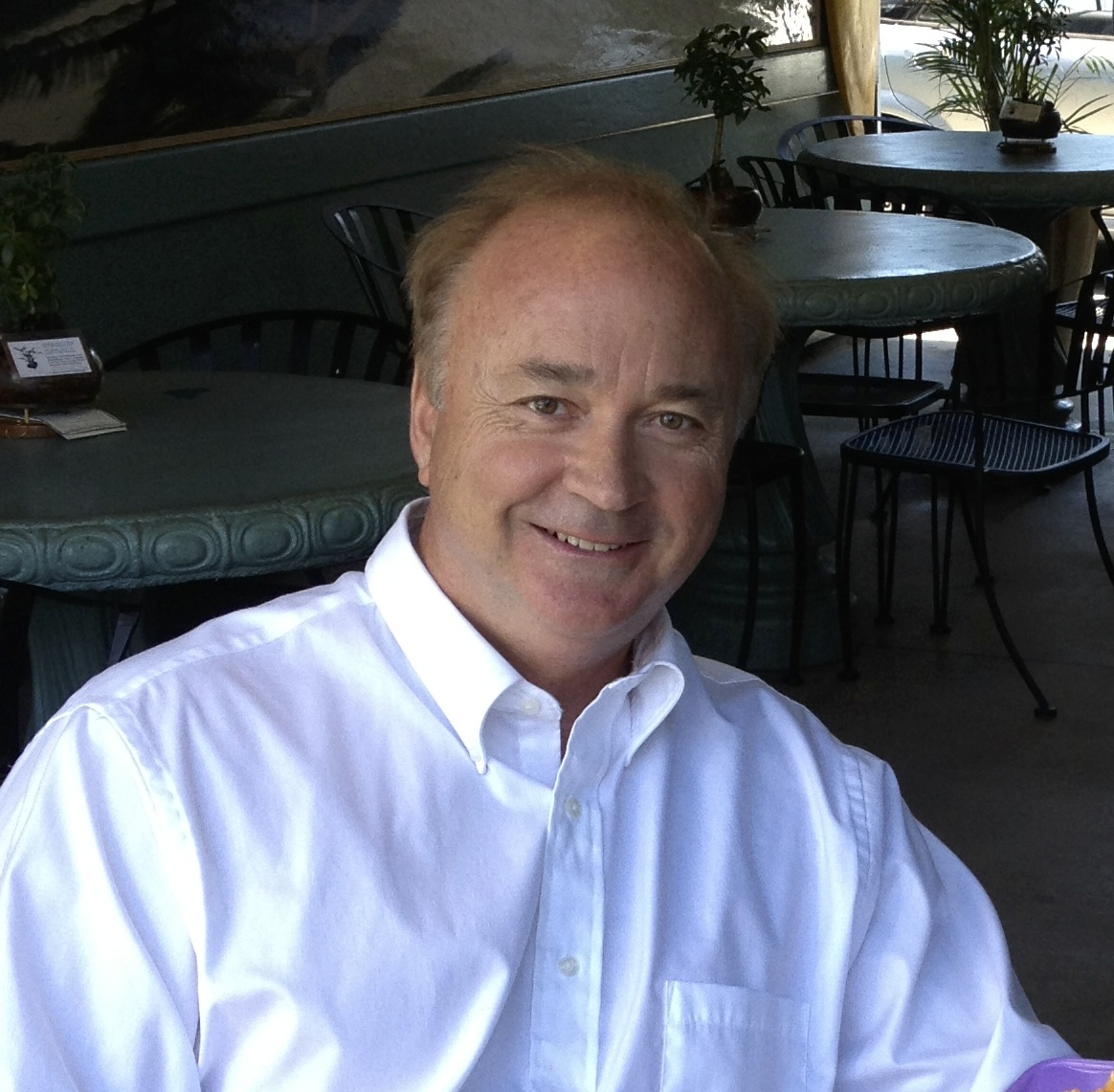
- Garn in 2013

Member of the Utah House of Representatives from the 16th District
- In office January 1, 2007 – March 13, 2010
- Preceded by: J. Stuart Adams
- Succeeded by: Stephen G. Handy
- In office January 1, 1991 – June 19, 2002
- Preceded by: Franklin W. Knowlton
- Succeeded by: J. Stuart Adams

58th House Majority Leader
- In office January 26, 2009 – March 13, 2010
- Preceded by: David Clark

House Assistant Majority Whip
- In office 1995–1996

Personal details
- Born: January 14, 1955 (age 71) Ogden, Utah, United States
- Party: Republican
- Education: Weber State University
- Profession: Businessman

Kevin Stacy Garn (born January 14, 1955) is an American politician as well as a business man. He was the former Republican majority leader of the Utah House of Representatives. Until his resignation on March 13, 2010, following personal disclosures, he represented District 16 of Utah, which covers Davis County, Utah.

== Early life, education and business career ==
Kevin Garn was born in Ogden, Utah and graduated from Layton High School. Garn attended Weber State University. He dropped out to focus on his business, KSG Distributing, a music and movie distribution company that he started while still in high school.

Garn founded Pegasus Music and Video, a music and retail store, in 1985 after purchasing an existing store in Bountiful. Pegasus expanded from one location to thirteen stores throughout Utah and in Montana, and Idaho. Garn sold Pegasus to Wherehouse Entertainment in 1993.

In 2004 Kevin Garn, partnered with Layton and Davis County, developed the Davis Conference Center, a 43,000-square-foot multi-use conference center connected to a Hilton Gardens.

Since 2000, Garn has served as the chairman of the board for The First National Bank of Layton.

Kevin Garn along with Michael Christensen started Garn Development, a real estate development company.

== Political career ==
Garn first became involved in politics in 1989 when Franklin Knowlton, a family friend and politician, retired from the Utah House of Representatives. Knowlton asked Garn to run for his soon-to-be vacant 16th District's seat. Garn won the seat.

Garn served in the Utah House of Representatives from January 1, 1991, to June 19, 2002, serving as Assistant Majority Whip in 1995 and 1996.

In 2002, Garn ran for the seat of Utah's 1st congressional district in the United States House of Representatives, but lost the Republican primary to Rob Bishop.

In the 2007 election he again won in the State 2009-2010 legislative session and served in the House Business and Labor Committee, Ethics Committee and the House Joint Subcommittee for Public Education Appropriations.

== Resignation ==
At the close of the 2010 legislative session, Garn admitted to a nude encounter with an underage female, Cheryl Maher, in a hot tub in 1985 when he was 28. Garn paid Maher $150,000 for signing a confidentiality agreement in 2002 when she threatened to expose the incident during his failed U.S. congressional campaign. Maher, who was an employee of Garn's company at the time, told the press that Garn lied about the lack of physical contact, but did not elaborate. Garn, who was married at the time, denied the activities went beyond sitting nude in the hot tub, but called the incident "clearly inappropriate".

Maher wrote to LDS Church president Thomas S. Monson asking for the church to seek action against Garn, who served as a bishop and Sunday school teacher at an LDS Church. The LDS Church responded to her letter by saying, "The 2008 letter sent by Ms. Maher to Church headquarters was referred to local ecclesiastical leaders to be addressed. Church disciplinary matters are handled at a local level and not at Church headquarters".

Garn resigned from the House on March 13, 2010, and the Davis County Republican Party picked businessman Stephen G. Handy to replace Garn on April 11; Handy worked with Garn in the Layton City Council. Handy was sworn in four days later.

Maher was killed in a murder-suicide in New Hampshire in July 2011.
