= Paper soccer =

Strategy game played on a paper grid representing a soccer or hockey field

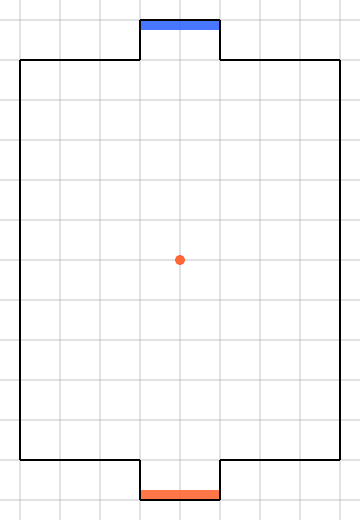
- An example board
- Genres: Paper and pencil game Abstract strategy game
- Players: 2
- Setup time: seconds
- Playing time: five minutes
- Synonyms: Paper hockey

Paper soccer (or paper hockey) is an abstract strategy game played on a square grid representing a soccer or hockey field. Two players take turns extending a line representing the position of a ball until it reaches one of the grid's two-goal spaces. A traditional paper-and-pencil game, it is commonly played in schools and can be found in some magazines. Many computer implementations of the game also exist. Despite the game's simple rules, paper soccer has various expanded strategies and tactics.

== General rules ==
The game's pitch is drawn as a rectangle on a grid, with small extended rectangles in the center of each of the two shortest sides to represent the two goalposts. The grid can be of any size, although both sides should be an even number of squares to allow a center point for kickoff. The goal areas are typically 2 × 1 squares in size.

A "ball" is marked as a dot in the center of the pitch. Players alternately move the ball to a new point by drawing a line from its current position to a new one. Each move must be to a point orthogonally or diagonally adjacent. The ball cannot be moved beyond the boundary of the pitch, nor along a line that has already been drawn (including the boundary of the pitch).

Example of a "bounce" move, shown in red: the player moves the ball one space west, and then bounces it another space west

If the ball is moved to a point that already has one or more lines connected to it, including the perimeter of the pitch, the ball "bounces" and the player immediately takes another turn. The player's move ends only when the ball reaches a point with no existing lines.

The winner is the player who places the ball in their opponent's goal. A player also wins if their opponent scores an own goal. If the ball reaches a point from which it cannot be moved (such as a corner of the pitch) this is regarded as a draw, or a loss for the player unable to move, depending on the rules being played. In some versions of the game, their own goals and moves that make it impossible to move are illegal.

=== Variants and modifications ===
The players can regulate the pitch's shape in various ways by altering the pitch's dimensions or the placement of the gates. In some variants, one or more special lines may be added to the pitch. This modification is found in computer applications, and expanded variants of this modification are used by PDE Football.

In some variants, gameplay can be continued from the central pitch's point after a goal is scored or after a play is blocked. The player who did not score moves first from the central point. The game is finished when a move from the central point is not possible, and the player who scored the most goals wins.

Another variant allows a player to make a "bounce" during any turn if the line of that bounce would cross an existing diagonal line.

Another variant is Texas Soccer which allows no "X" marks to be made as the ball can no longer cross through a diagonal line.

== Strategy ==
Example of blocking a gate

Since the ball's movement cannot overlap previously drawn lines, a player can block their opponent's potential moves by filling strategic points on the board and limiting the mobility of their opponent. Another strategy is based on the use of "bounces" for streamlining mobility, which can greatly aid in scoring goals or blocking access to the player's own goal area. In versions of the game where a player who cannot move loses, a player can focus on moving the ball to a position where their opponent cannot move it further.

In some early computerized versions of this game, the AI player tends to choose the shortest path to the player's goal, ignoring bounces and other strategies. That strategy is not universal. Computer version of Paper Soccer include graphs and pathfinding (just as other games like Quoridor). Computer programs still do not play this game at competitive/top level.

== Game notation ==
This series of moves can be notated as "0", "3", "67", "5" and "0"

Each move in the game may be recorded as a string of one or more digits from 0 to 7, each digit representing the direction of a move (with 0 corresponding to 'north', 1 to 'north-east', 2 to 'east' and so on) across a single grid. Multiple digits are used to record bounce moves. This notation has been used in a PlayOK.com service.

== Similar games ==
There are two similar games that imitate paper soccer. Their mechanisms also depend on drawing lines to describe a ball's movement on a field.

=== Paper soccer (Russian variant) ===
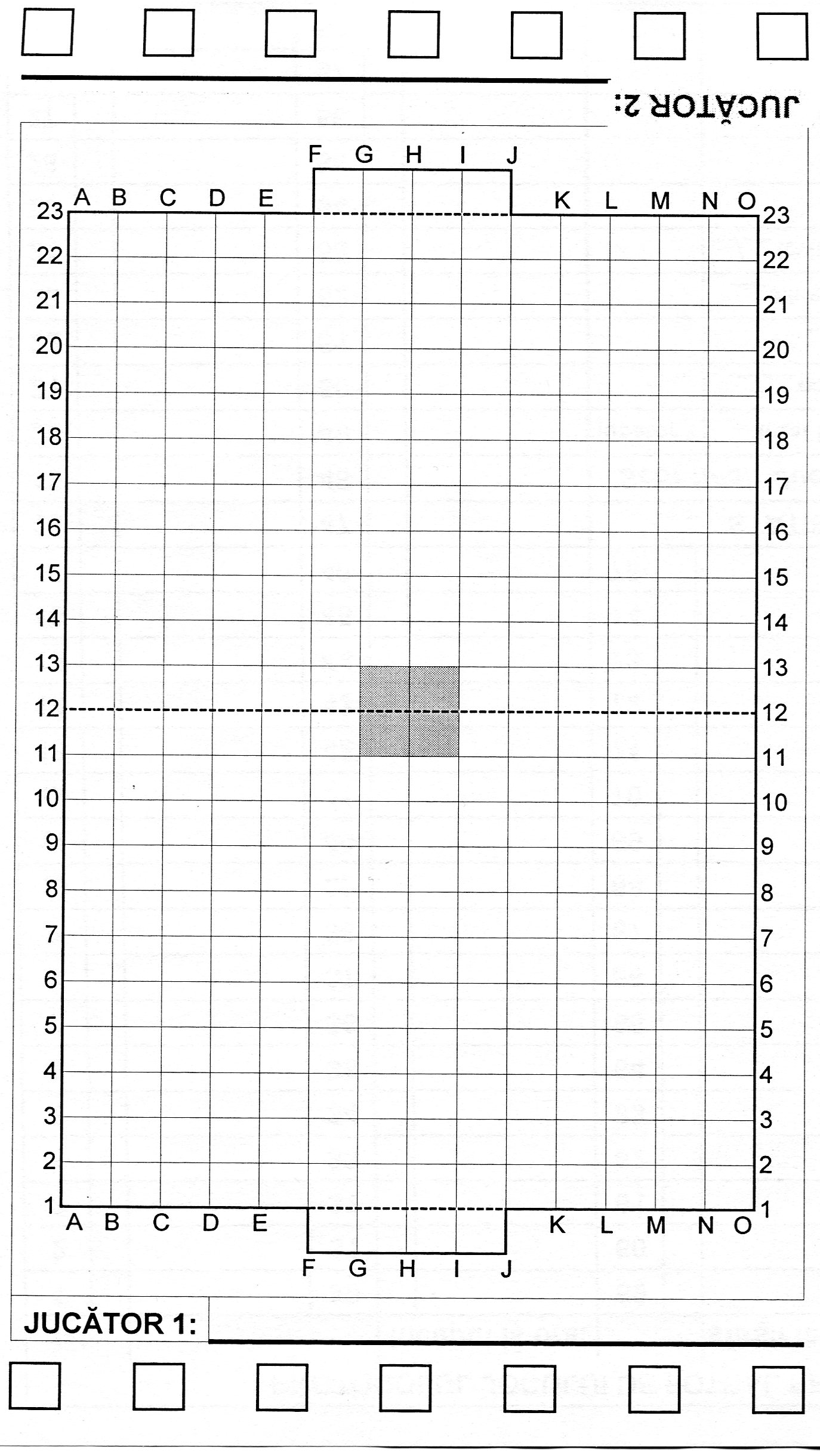
Usually in Russian variant of paper soccer, the pitch has much larger dimensions

This paper-and-pencil game also involves drawing lines to adjacent points on a grid and is distinguished by a larger play area and players extending the line to three points each turn. The line can change direction at each point but must not touch any existing line (there are no bounce moves). If a player becomes trapped and unable to draw this line, then their turn is forfeited and the opponent gets a "penalty kick". This special move is a straight line in any of the eight compass directions, extending six points, and is the only occasion that other lines may be crossed. If the penalty lands on an already-occupied point or there are less than three unoccupied points available to move, an additional penalty kick is earned. After six such penalties, if there are insufficient valid moves then the other player starts with a penalty kick. Some versions with very large grids have players extend the line through four points per turn and penalty kicks across 13 points.

The strategy involves blocking an opponent's potential moves, outmaneuvering the opponent at the edges of the field, and setting traps for penalty kicks in range of the opponent's goal. If a trap is not executed successfully, the opponent may be able to reverse it in an extreme move.

The game was popular in many parts of the former Soviet Union. Several Russian magazines describe the game and there are a number of computer versions as well.

=== xrSoccer ===
Published in 2005, xrSoccer is a computer game by eXtreme Results International Inc. It may be adapted to paper-and-pencil form for two players. It has common features with the previously described versions of paper soccer but gameplay generally differs.

The pitch is a 14 × 20 grid (13 × 19 points) with goal gates on the shorter sides. Starting from the center point, the line is extended to three points per turn. The line can touch occupied points and cross existing lines (there are no bounce moves) but cannot move along an existing line. If a player has no place to extend the line, the computer repositions the ball on the nearest unblocked point. This can be favourable when executed properly, as the ball is usually moved depending on the last direction of the line before it became blocked, and can be used to maneuver closer to the opponent's goal. After scoring a goal, the ball is reset to the center point and the game continues until all possible goals are scored.

== See also ==
- Table Football

== Bibliography ==
- Joanne O'sullivean I Don't Care pp 212 (standard version)
- Mariusz Ławicki 155 gier i zabaw z dzieckiem, dziećmi i dla dzieci pp 14 ISBN 978-83-931024-0-2, 2010 (standard version)
- Olga Bogdanova, 300 лучших игр для веселой компании от бывалого тамады, приколиста и заводилы (large playing area)
- Комиссарова, Елена (5 September 2017). Самые известные игры на бумаге. ISBN 9785457927346. (large playing area)
