= Michael W. Clune =

American writer

Michael W. Clune is an American writer, critic and academic. He is the author of the addiction memoir White Out (2013), A Defense of Judgement (2021), the novel Pan (2025) and other books. He is a contributing editor at Harper's Magazine and writes regularly for that magazine and others. He has taught at Case Western Reserve University and (since 2025) The Ohio State University.

== Biography ==
Clune was born in Ireland and grew up in Chicago. He received his BA from Oberlin College, and his PhD from Johns Hopkins University. Until 2025, he was the Samuel B. and Virginia C. Knight Professor of Humanities in the Department of English in the College of Arts and Sciences at Case Western Reserve University in Cleveland. Since 2025 he has taught at the Chase Center of The Ohio State University.

== Writing ==
Clune's memoir, White Out: The Secret Life of Heroin, was chosen as a Best Book of 2013 by The New Yorker, NPR's On Point, and other venues. The critic Gideon Lewis-Kraus wrote that "the unusual risk taken by Clune's unusually good addiction memoir is its enduring lyrical reverence for heroin," and worried that this might inadvertently make the drug seem attractive to readers. One critic noted that White Out and Clune's academic book Writing Against Time deal in similar ways with the human desire to experience the world as if for the first time.

Clune's second work of creative nonfiction, Gamelife, was published by Farrar, Straus and Giroux in 2015. The critic Bijan Stephen wrote that Clune describes computer games as "spiritual experiences," and argued that Clune addresses heroin and games "in the same transcendent manner."

Clune's book (2021), A Defense of Judgement, argued for restoring the role of aesthetic judgement in academia, and received numerous responses.

His first novel, Pan, appeared in the summer of 2025 from Penguin Press.

In 2019, Clune was named a Fellow by the John Simon Guggenheim Memorial Foundation.

Clune writes regularly for Harper's Magazine, where he is a contributing editor. His creative and critical writing has also appeared in Salon, Granta, PMLA, The New Yorker, and other publications.

In November 2024 Clune published an essay in the The Chronicle of Higher Education titled "We Asked for It," arguing that politicization of academia over the past decade had brought on the second Trump administration's attacks.

== Bibliography ==
Criticism

- American Literature and the Free Market (Cambridge University Press, 2010)
- Writing Against Time (Stanford University Press, 2013)
- A Defense of Judgement (University of Chicago Press, 2021)

Memoir

- White Out (Hazelden, 2013, second edition McNally Editions, 2023)
- Gamelife (Farrar, Straus, and Giroux, 2015)

Fiction

- Pan (Penguin Books, 2025)
