= Dots (paper-and-pencil game) =

Abstract strategy game

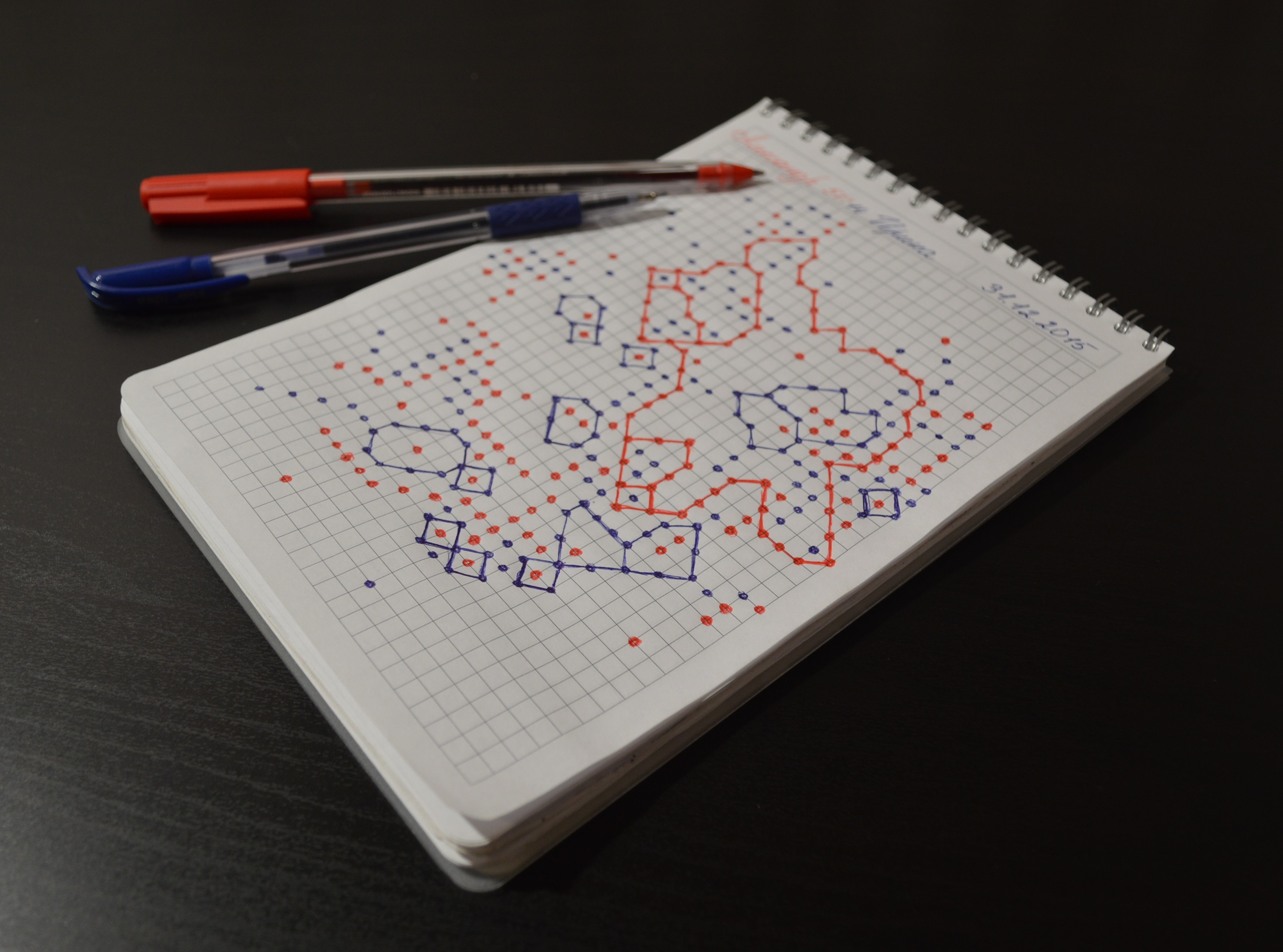
- Dots is played with two pens of two different colors and a piece of squared paper. The goal is to surround more dots than the opponent.
- Years active: second half of 20th century to present
- Genres: Board game Abstract strategy game
- Players: 2
- Setup time: Minimal
- Playing time: 5–90 minutes
- Chance: None
- Skills: Strategy, tactics, observation

Dots (Czech: Židi, Polish: Kropki, Russian: Точки) is an abstract strategy game, played by two or more people on a sheet of squared paper. The goal is to "capture" enemy dots by surrounding them with a continuous line of one's own dots. Once an area containing enemy dots is surrounded, that area ceases to be playable.

The game is somewhat similar to Go and also has some similarities to the simpler and smaller dots and boxes game.

== Rules ==
=== Field ===
Dots is played on a grid of any finite size, traditionally 39×32, the size of the grid that is often encountered on a page of squared copybook in Russia. Players take turns to place a dot of their own color (players usually being red and blue) on an empty intersection of the grid.

=== Capture rule ===
Animation of a game beginning

If a newly-placed dot completes a closed chain of dots of the same color which encloses at least one of the enemy dots, then all the area inside it is surrounded. To form a chain dots must be adjacent to each other either vertically, horizontally or diagonally. Surrounded enemy dots are added to the score of the player who surrounded them (but the player's own dots are not counted). All enclosed dots and empty intersections are excluded from further play and cannot be used to make new surrounds. To mark a newly surrounded area, the surrounding player must draw a boundary line through all of their dots that are part of enclosing chain; to make it more visual the area can also be shaded in the player's color.

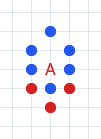
Blue cannot capture empty area without red dots. Because of this, red player is threatening to play in A and capture one blue dot.

Players cannot surround areas that do not have enemy dots inside. As a consequence the enemy can use empty intersections inside an enclosed area to complete their own enclosing chain. However, if one places a dot into empty area surrounded by the opponent and cannot immediately use it to surround, then this dot can be captured by the opponent (this kind of suicide move is never beneficial but is not prohibited).

Often there is more than one way of choosing an enclosing chain of dots. When played with pens and paper, players are free to choose one however they like. When the game is played on a computer, to simplify user input, programs usually automatically surround the minimum area. In some cases this can be tactically exploited to one's advantage.

=== Ending ===
The goal of the game is to capture more dots than the opponent. Traditionally, informal games of dots were played until one of the players surrendered.

In modern competitive play, a grounding rule is used: continuous groups of dots that touch the border of the field cannot be surrounded and thus not be captured any more. These dots are said to be grounded. At any point in the game either player can stop the game, effectively saying "All the dots that I want to preserve are grounded. You can take everything else." After that, their opponent is allowed to make as many moves as desired to capture as many remaining dots as possible. The game then ends, and whoever captured most dots wins. In a weak position a good player will usually surrender before their opponent has to explicitly apply this rule.

=== Initial position ===
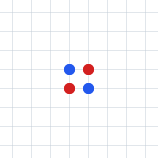
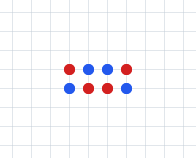
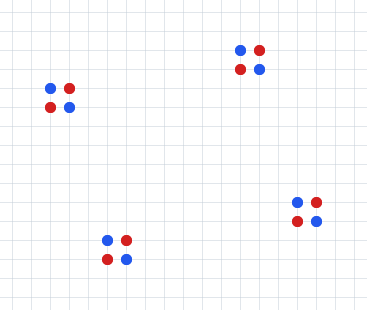
Initial positions that are commonly used (from left to right): cross, double cross, four crosses (only center of the board is shown)

If one of the players only places their dots touching the border, none of them could be ever captured. To prevent forced draw situations, the game is usually played either from initial position or with first several moves restricted to some area around the center of the field. The most popular initial position is a cross. Other popular ones are double cross and four crosses placed randomly. A general trend is that the more crosses are initially placed on the field, the more active, less probable to end in a draw, and more challenging the game will be for both players.

== Variant ==
kropki na dwie kratki

In a variant called kropki na dwie kratki it is allowed to draw a line of length two orthogonally or diagonally over an unoccupied point, or between points a knight's move away. This variant is said to encourage offensive play.
