= Macroscope (novel) =

1969 novel by Piers Anthony

- First edition (p/b)
- Author: Piers Anthony
- Cover artist: Charles Santore
- Language: English
- Genre: Science fiction
- Publisher: Avon Books
- Publication date: 1969
- Publication place: United States
- Media type: Print (hardback and paperback)
- ISBN: 0-380-00209-4
- OCLC: 5789058

Macroscope is a science fiction novel by British-American writer Piers Anthony. It was nominated for the Hugo Award for Best Novel in 1970.

Macroscope was first published in 1969 and in some respects reflects the idealistic values of that time. The plot involves, among other things, an extension of the Peckham Experiment, mathematicians John Conway and Michael Paterson's game of sprouts, astrology, the poetry of Sidney Lanier, the history of Phoenicia, and commentary on the value of a dedicated teacher of a subject contrasted with a practicing engineer of that subject attempting to teach it, all in a kaleidoscopic combination. The book fills a unique place in Anthony's work as one that has garnered good reviews from hard-core science fiction fans as well as his usual audience of fantasy fans.

== Plot ==
The central plot device is the "macroscope", a large crystal that can be used to focus a newly discovered type of particle, the "macron". Macrons are not subject to many of the effects that interfere with light, and as a result the macroscope can focus on any location in space-time with exceptional clarity, producing what is essentially a telescope of infinite resolution in the space-time continuum. The macroscope has been built into a solar-orbiting space station where scientists visit to book time on the device. Using it, they are able to explore space as never before. Among their many discoveries are numerous planets and two intelligent alien races. Using the macroscope, observers were able to look into one race's historical records, finding numerous parallels with human life on Earth. The race is now in social decline, and the implications are worrying.

The macroscope's clear view across space also makes it an ideal communications system for intelligent races, who broadcast signals by generating macrons, a technique not yet understood on Earth. However, over-riding all of these signals is another of enormous power, one of such strength that it must have been constructed by a Type II civilization. This signal repeats itself, starting with instructions on basic math and progressing to ever-more complex information. Viewers with high enough intelligence, an IQ of 150, reach a point where the information causes them to go insane or die. Those without the intelligence to understand the advanced portions of the signal are unaffected. The signal appears to be a deliberate attempt to "jam" macroscopic communications, blocking those with the ability to understand the other signals from being able to see them. They refer to the blocking signal simply as the "destroyer".

The protagonist of the story, Ivo Archer, is taken to the macroscope station on the invitation of a childhood friend, Brad Carpenter. Ivo has an unexplained link to a mysterious hyper-intelligent character, Schön, and Brad believes Schön may be able to break through the destroyer signal. Ivo is not so convinced, and is reluctant to ask for Schön's help. This reluctance is cause for some misunderstanding with Brad's girlfriend, Afra Summerfield, with whom Ivo falls hopelessly in love.

While inadvertently viewing the destroyer signal with Brad and a Senator visiting the project, only Ivo survives the experience. Afra concludes Ivo is not intelligent enough to be affected, and finds him somewhat beneath her as a result. The Senator's death sparks a series of events that lead to Ivo, Afra and two other station members, Harold and Beatryx, stealing the macroscope. Afra, still in love with Brad and hoping to find a cure, brings his body along, now in a vegetative state. They detach the macroscope from the station and fly off with it while United Nations ships give chase. With time on their hands, Ivo turns to the macroscope and finds a way to avoid being overwhelmed by the destroyer signal. This reveals a number of broadcasts from farther out in space. Ivo demonstrates this technique to the others, allowing Harold and Afra to view the signals formerly being hidden. Harold, a talented engineer, uses the information from one of the signals to build a device reducing their bodies to a liquid state, allowing them to accelerate at 10 g and escape the pursuing ships.

They travel to Neptune space, following a cryptic message left by Schön. Here they set up camp on Triton. Afra attempts to cure Brad by shocking him while he is being reconstituted from the liquid state, but the attempt fails and Brad is killed. Over time, and with further help from Ivo, the group watches a benign form of the entire broadcast, which they come to call "traveller". The liquefaction technique is only the first of many shown in the traveller signal, which describes an entire suite of technologies that allow interstellar travel. Using the instructions in the signal, they convert Neptune into an interstellar spaceship.

Schön briefly makes his first appearance during construction, revealing himself to be an alternate personality within Ivo's brain. Schön is ostensibly the body's "owner", having created the Ivo personality to avoid being the subject of experimentation. Schön has frightening intelligence, but having given over his body to Ivo at the age of five, is still a child and largely without morals. In an attempt to take control of the body, Schön traps Ivo in a historical drama running in his own brain. Over time, Ivo sees parallels between the characters in the drama and the group in the ship, and eventually escapes the illusion and re-asserts control.

The group decides to hunt down the source of the destroyer signal in an effort to turn it off. Travelling 15,000 light-years from Earth, they find it is being broadcast from an abandoned space station. Exploring the inner portions of the station, which is a large museum, they are individually drawn into a series of visions that reveal different aspects of the nature of the destroyer and its history. The traveller signal had arrived relatively late in the history of the galaxy, in the midst of flourishing communications via macroscope. Armed with the ability for interstellar travel, wars broke out that destroyed countless civilizations. The destroyer station, one of six in the galaxy, was set up to prevent this until the races reached the required level of cultural sophistication, if they ever did.

Emerging from one of these visions, Afra discovers that Schön has once again taken over from Ivo. Intelligent enough that the signal would kill him, he has solved this problem via surgery that altered his brain chemistry to block most of the signal. This took six months to complete, keeping him "pinned" during the interval. Schön plays a game with Afra, now the only other surviving member of the original group, with the stakes being that the winner gets to select who, Schön or Ivo, gets the body. During the game, the real reason for Ivo's creation comes forth; the original Ivo was a girl with intelligence similar to Schön's, a situation neither could tolerate. After murdering her during a game played to the death with rules only the two of them could comprehend, Schön created the new Ivo to escape the retribution of his peers.

Playing the game by the rules and losing, Afra instead tricks Schön into the room broadcasting the destroyer signal. Here it is so powerful that it overwhelms Schön's surgical blocks, and Ivo is able to take control. Now in command of his own personality, along with all of Schön's intellectual capacity, Ivo wins Afra's heart. At the end of the story the reader is left to decide whether or not the people of Earth are mature enough and ready for interstellar travel.

== Themes ==
Macroscope's story is interwoven by many themes taken from a variety of sources.

Among these are references to the personality traits each of the four members of the group embody. Harold is a student of astrology, and through his character each of the group member's signs are revealed; Ivo is a fire sign, Afra earth, Harold air, and Beatryx water. At several points, Anthony mentions that only the four together, acting as a unit, can solve the problems presented to them. These traits are explored throughout the book, but especially during the closing sequences, where they form the basis of the game between Afra and Schön.

Anthony also explores the concepts of logic and understanding, especially through Afra. Her attempt to revive Brad had no hope of succeeding, something she was aware of, but ignored. During a mock trial following Brad's death, Harold explores the differences between emotion and logic, demonstrating that Afra's deliberate clamping down of her emotions led her to subvert logic. This is again explored later in the book, as Schön battles her.

Anthony also uses Ivo as a stand-in for Sidney Lanier, a poet. Portions of Lanier's poetry are used throughout the book, and in other cases passages of the book closely reflect themes in Lanier's work. Through flashbacks throughout the book, Lanier's life is explored.

Next to last, Brad and Ivo/Schön both come from a special project in Philadelphia clearly modelled in some ways on Britain's Peckham Experiment, initiated during the Great Depression. That project showed the great benefits of most improvements of overall health care in a community context, not just for the clinical health of the participants, but the effectiveness of the Peckham social milieu on reducing social problems, in particular, poverty.

Finally, the overarching theme of the book explores mankind's potential for self-destruction, seen both through the example of the "prob" race as well as an exploration of humanity. Early in the book Brad complains that the population of 5 billion is unsustainable unless mankind reaches the stars, but he doubts their ability and maturity to do so. This theme is covered throughout the work, including the closing sentence.

== Reception ==
Macroscope was a finalist for the 1970 Hugo Award for Best Novel.
