= The Peckham Experiment =

Social experiment in public health

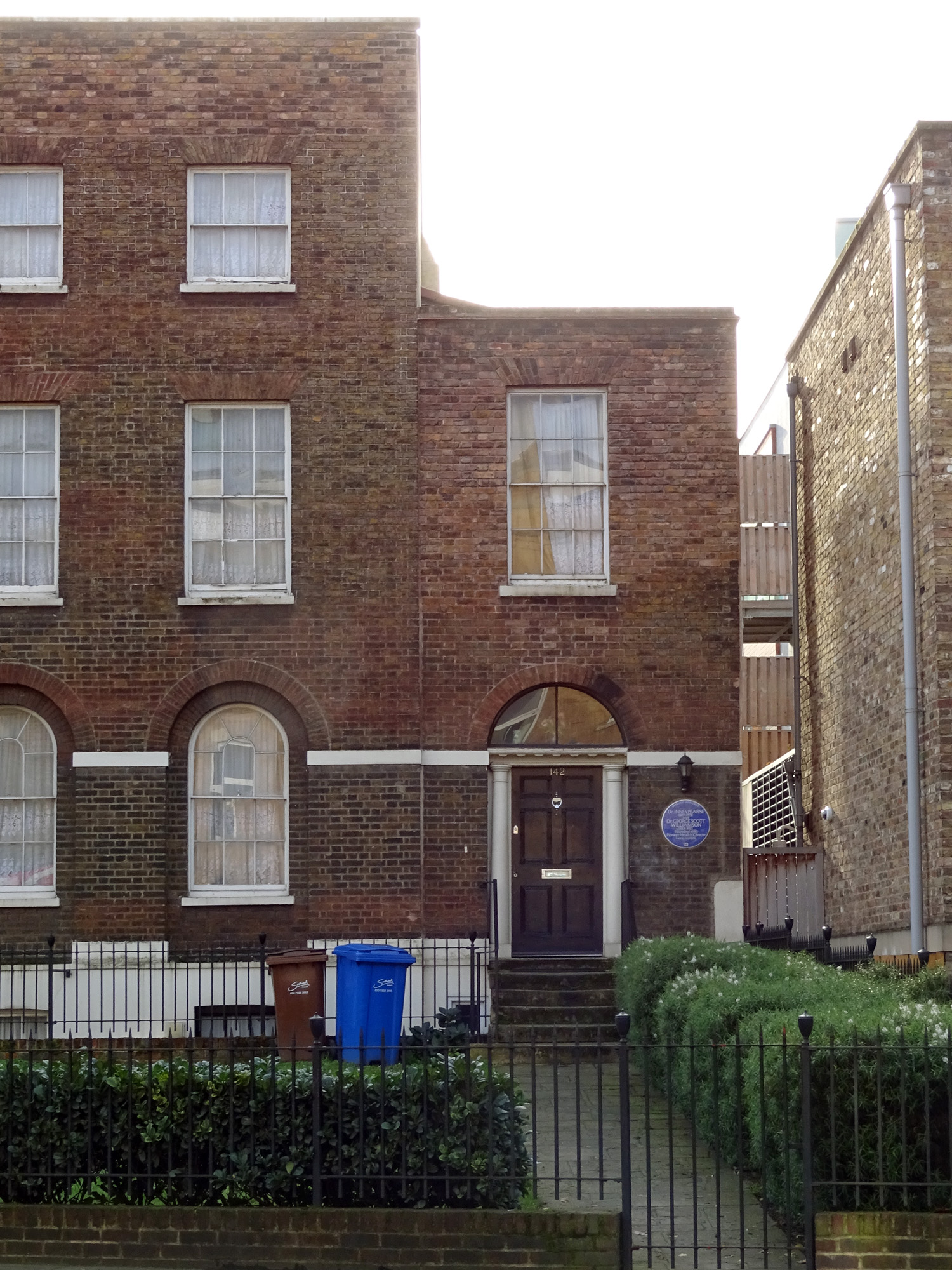
Site where the experiment in Peckham began in 1926

The Peckham Experiment was an experiment designed to determine whether people as a whole would, given the opportunity, take a vested interest in their own health and fitness and expend effort to maintain it. The experiment took place between 1926 and 1950, initially generated by rising public concern over the health of the working class and an increasing interest in preventive social medicine.

== Commencement ==
George Scott Williamson (1884–1953) and Innes Hope Pearse (1889–1978), two doctors who later married, opened the Pioneer Health Centre in a house in Queen's Road SE5 in 1926, choosing Peckham, in south east London, because "this populace roughly represents a cross-section of the total populace of the nation with as widely differing a cultural admixture as it is possible to find in any circumscribed metropolitan area" –. Their aim was to study health as a medical condition in a manner comparable to studies of the natural history of disease. The first phase closed in 1929. The findings were disseminated, and funding was then sought to build a larger, purpose-designed, centre. This re-opened in 1935 in a purpose-built modern building in St Mary's Road, often quoted as an early example of how new architectural techniques could help further bold new social experiments.

The new building, designed by Sir Owen Williams was described in detail in the Bulletin of the Pioneer Health Centre, 1949. It moved away from the traditional lines dominating medical buildings. Williams created a large open space using the latest structural techniques, allowing the centre's doctors to properly observe the members. At the middle of the centre a large swimming pool was covered by a glazed roof, which, along with large areas of windows, allowed natural light into the building. These windows could be fully opened to circulate fresh air into the building. The cork floors allowed people to move about barefoot.

== Subjects ==
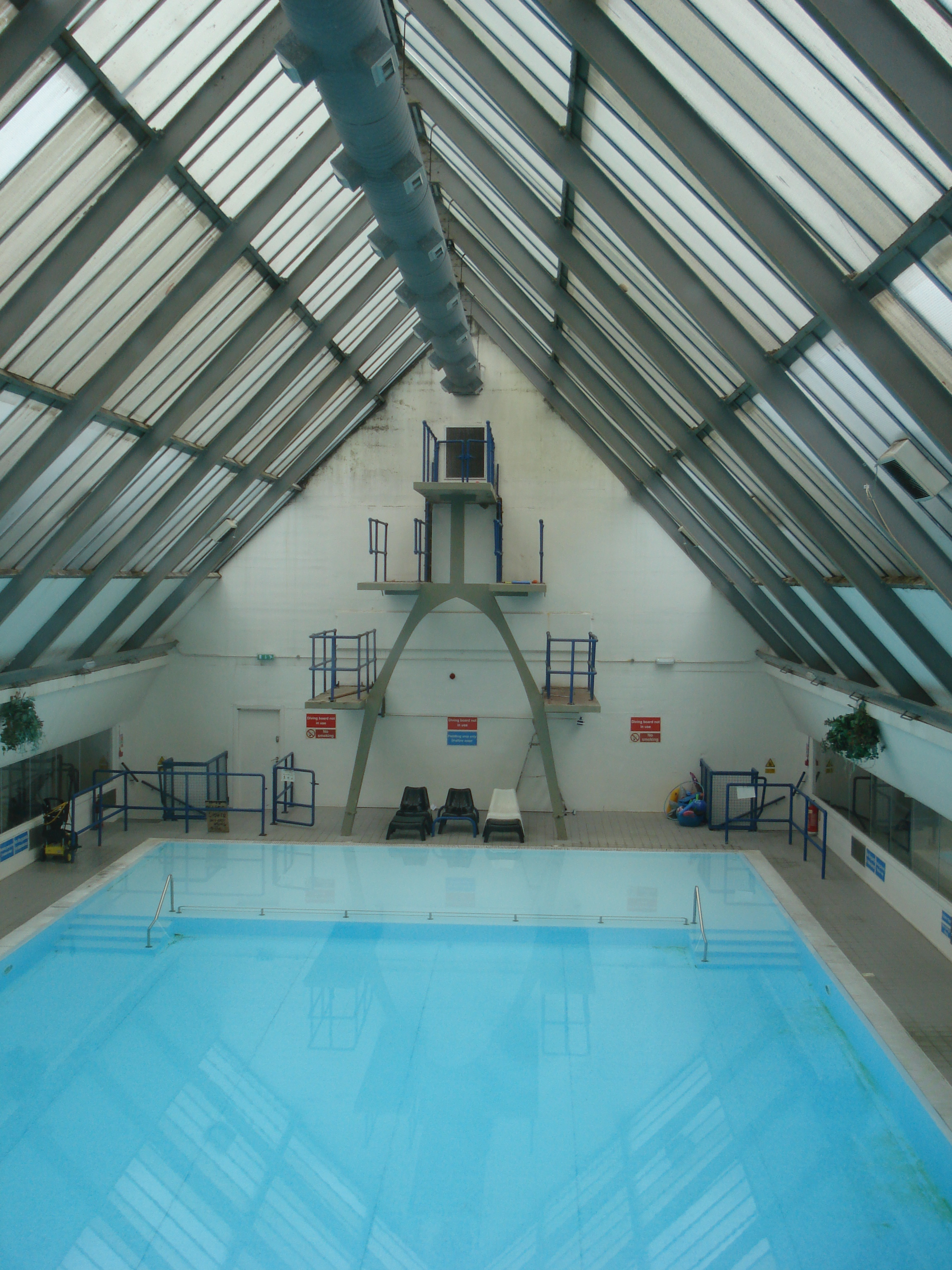
Pool at the 1930s Pioneer Health Centre

Williamson and Pearse recruited 950 local families to be part of "The Peckham Experiment". By paying a nominal membership fee of one shilling (equivalent to £3 in 2025) a week, a family had access to a range of activities such as physical exercise, swimming, games and workshops. Members underwent a medical examination once a year, and they were monitored throughout the year as they participated in the centre's events.

Central to Scott Williamson's philosophy was the belief that left to themselves people would spontaneously begin to organise in a creative way, and this happened, the members initiating a wide range of sporting, social and cultural activities using the facilities offered by the centre.

== Closure ==
The centre went into abeyance during the Second World War, but was restored to a condition fit for re-opening by the members themselves. Edwina Mountbatten was a governor in 1949. In 1950, however, it finally closed, since its innovative approach did not fit well with the new National Health Service, and it proved impossible to obtain adequate funding from other sources to keep it going as an independent concern. As noted by Duncan (1985),

“In many ways, both the wellness movement and the family practice movement were foreshadowed by their family-centered approach and their finding that most apparently well individuals actually suffered from some detectable disorder.”

The buildings were later transferred to Southwark Council. The council operated a leisure centre in the buildings (including the swimming pool), and they also provided educational facilities as part of the Southwark Adult Education Institute.

Williamson, Pearse and some others involved in the experiment were supporters of organic farming, and they became involved with the Soil Association in 1946.

Writing in the 1960s, the sociologist Peter Townsend reflected that 'as a boy I knew one of the doctors involved in the Peckham health Centre and had always been inspired by its ideals'.

In the 1990s the remaining buildings were sold by the council and converted into housing, but retain listed building status. This occurred after the responsibility for adult education was significantly reduced and transferred from the local council to Southwark College. Replacement leisure facilities were provided at the Peckham Pulse Healthy Living Centre by Peckham Town Square.

== The twenty-first century ==
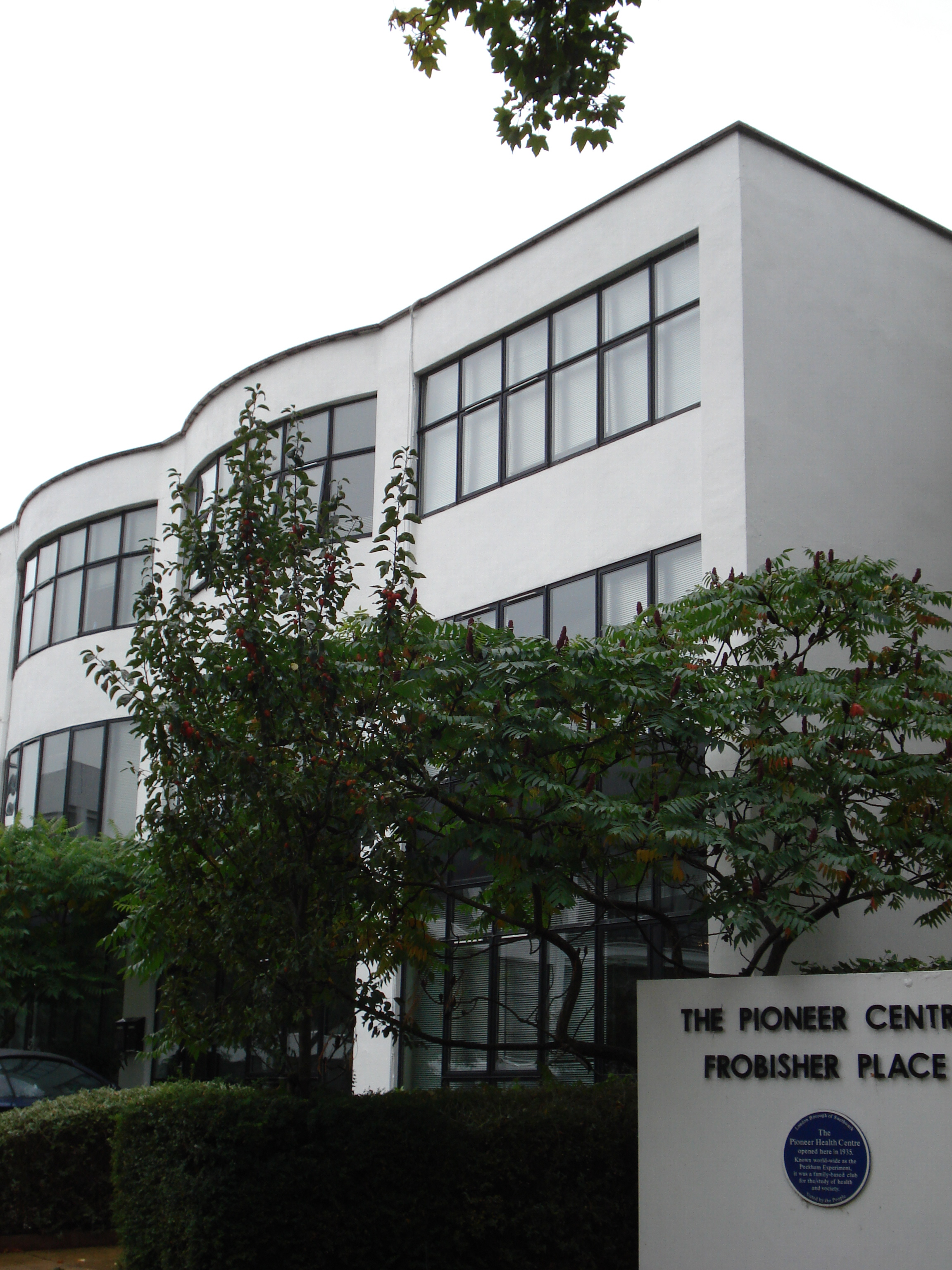
The 1930s building designed by Owen Williams

The Pioneer Health Foundation, the charity responsible for the Peckham Experiment, continues to exist as a registered charity under English law, the trustees recognising a need to disseminate the findings and also to keep open the possibility of a further centre or centres opening. Notwithstanding the many changes to society and medicine since the Peckham Experiment, the foundation believes that the principles identified by Williamson are basic to health and are of continuing relevance to society. This includes the valuable evidence produced about the relationship between social and home environment and individual motivation and health.

As part of its activities, the foundation launched the "Mary Langman Prize", an annual award for an essay on "The Relevance of the Peckham Experiment in the 21st Century" that furthers the lessons learnt at the Pioneer Health Centre about the social, emotional and environmental determinants of health. Mary Langman was personal assistant to Scott Williamson and made a bequest to enable such initiatives.

== References in literature ==
The Peckham Experiment is referred to in the science fiction novel Macroscope by Piers Anthony, wherein an extension of the Peckham Experiment techniques are used to raise a group of children to far-above-average intelligence, resulting in one transcendental genius. It is also mentioned in "Notes Toward the Definition of Culture", by T. S. Eliot during his discussion on education and the family. The experiment is also briefly referenced in Franz Fanon's book Black Skin, White Masks when discussing the connection between of the prestige of the French language and the social status of educated Antillean blacks returning to Martinique after visiting and being educated in France.

The surviving archives of the Pioneer Health Centre, which include personal papers of Scott Williamson and Innes Pearse, as well as material on subsequent attempts to recreate the experiment elsewhere, are now in the Wellcome Library. There are also numerous books published during and after the centre's lifespan by individuals who were involved in its work.

== See also ==
- Healthcare in London
