= Pegasus Music and Video =

Pegasus Music and Video was a locally owned retailer based in Utah. The store started out as a single location in Bountiful, Utah. In 1985, the music retailer was purchased by Kevin Garn. Within eight years, the store grew from one location to fifteen locations spread across Utah, Wyoming, and Montana. By 1990, Pegasus began focusing more on rentals. Garn's music stores were known for carrying children's movies and instructional videos.

Pegasus Music and Video was purchased for $10 million by Wherehouse Entertainment in 1993. After purchasing Pegasus, Wherehouse Music became the largest music and video retailer in Utah.
