= PlayOK =

Classic board and card game website

- Website type: Educational; Entertainment
- Available in: Polish, English, 33 other languages
- Founder: Marek Futrega
- Website: www.playok.com
- Launched: April 24, 2002; 24 years ago

Polish version logo

PlayOK, also known as kurnik ("chicken coop"), is a website of classic board and card games to play online against live opponents in real-time. It was created in 2001 by Marek Futrega, and was initially a Polish-only website. As of early 2005 it supported over 30 board and card games, and the site is available in 33 languages so far.

== History ==
It is the most popular on-line board game website in Poland.

Since 7 October 2004 all game rules at Kurnik's web pages are available under the Creative Commons attribution-noncommercial licence.

Other interesting technical solutions:

- Since 2012 all games are HTML5-based with support for mobile devices after migrating from Java applets
- The service collects extensive player statistics and maintains a complete archive of games played in the last 6 months. Games can be replayed or downloaded in popular formats (PGN, PBN, SGF and others).
- Fully automated online tournaments including private ones (organised by users).
- Guest mode for playing or observing games.

According to a gemiusTraffic research, in December 2004 the website was visited by 1.2 million unique users. The Polish version has about 100.000 registered users and, as of January 2007, an Alexa Internet ranking of around 1,200.

Until 1 May 2002 Scrabble was also available at Kurnik, under the name Szkrable. After a threat of legal action from Cronix, the company with the rights to Internet versions of the game, Kurnik developed a similar game called "Literaxx" (Literaki ;-) in Polish), which differed from Scrabble only because of a different board, but Cronix considered these changes too minor for it not to be a copyright violation. Marek Futrega then developed Literaki ;-) into a new word-based game with different rules than Scrabble. The Literaki ;-) rules are public domain. Similarly, a free equivalent of Monopoly, "Blogpoly" (Netopol in Polish) is also available.

As of April 5, 2008, Kurnik.org changed its name to playok.com.

On February 27, 2022, to support Ukraine, which was invaded by Russia, playok.com marked the Ukrainian flag on its homepage.

== Games available ==
- Chess
- Checkers (Thai, Russian)
- Dice
- Dominoes
- Draughts (100, Tanzanian, Spanish)
- Go
- Gomoku
- 3-5-8
- Barbu-king
- Bridge
- Canasta
- Cribbage
- Durak
- Euchre
- Reversi
- Backgammon
- Ludo
- Mahjong
- Makruk
- Shogi
- Xiangqi
- Hex
- Paper soccer
- Gin rummy
- Hearts
- Oh hell
- Pan
- Pinochle
- Skat
- Spades
- Togyzkumalak
- Switch
- Lines

== Dictionary ==
Kurnik is also a host for the biggest free software dictionary available for the Polish language. Collaboratively developed, it was initially meant to be just a tool to help validate moves in word-based games, but it subsequently replaced basically all other freely available dictionaries used in free software projects. The dictionary is dual-licensed under cc-sa and the GPL.
