= Double exposure (disambiguation) =

Double exposure is the outcome of overlaying an image on a previously exposed film, either deliberately or accidentally.

Double exposure may also refer to:

== Film ==
- Double Exposures (1937 film), directed by John Paddy Carstairs
- Double Exposure (1944 film), directed by William Berke
- Double Exposure (1954 film), directed by John Gilling
- Double Exposure (1976 film), starring Anouska Hempel
- Double Exposure (1982 film), directed by William Byron Hillman
- Double Exposure, aka The November Men, a 1993 film directed by Paul Williams
- Double Exposure (1994 film), starring Ron Perlman
- Double Exposure (2014 film), directed by Li Jinhang

== Television and radio ==
- Double Exposure (comedy series), a Canadian radio and TV show
- Double Exposure (U.S. TV series), a reality television series aired on Bravo
- Double Exposure (game show), a Heatter-Quigley Productions game show which aired in 1961
- "Double Exposure", an episode from the third season of Columbo

== Music ==
- Double Exposure (Nat Adderley album)
- Double Exposure (Joe Chambers album)
- Double Exposure (Chris Connor and Maynard Ferguson album)
- Double Exposure (band), an American band from the disco era
- Double Exposure (John Pizzarelli album)

== Other ==
- Double exposure patterning, a technique for improving the resolution of patterning semiconductors
- Double Exposure Blackjack, a variety of blackjack
- Life Is Strange: Double Exposure, a 2024 video game
- Double Exposure (Shadowrun), a 1994 adventure for the role-playing game Shadowrun
- Double Exposure (novel), by Australian author Brian Caswell
- Double exposure (poetic form) invented by Greg Williamson

== See also ==
- Exposure (disambiguation)
- Double Xposure, a 2012 Chinese film
