= Innes Hope Pearse =

English medical practitioner and biologist

- Innes Pearse in 1948
- Born: March 8, 1889
- Died: December 25, 1978 (aged 89)
- Occupations: Doctor and health researcher
- Notable work: The Peckham Experiment

Innes Hope Pearse (1889–1978) was an English medical doctor who co-founded a health centre that became famous as part of the Peckham Experiment. This was a project rooted in Pearse's interest in studying and promoting health in a social context.

== Education and early career ==
Innes Pearse was born in March 1889 and grew up in Purley, Surrey with her parents Catherine Beardsley Pearse née Morley and George Edgar Hope Pearse, an exporter. After going to a private school in Croydon, Woodford House School, she studied at the London School of Medicine for Women where she qualified as a doctor in 1915. After a couple of years at the Bristol Royal Hospital for Women and Children, she was back in London in 1918. Her next post was at the Great Northern Hospital, and then she became a registrar at the London Hospital (one of the first women to become a hospital registrar) followed by a job at St Thomas's. For seven years, she was also part-time medical adviser to the Alice Model infant welfare centre in the East End, a charitable project. She continued this alongside a thyroid research project at the Royal Free Hospital which she joined as a medical registrar in 1921, working with George Scott Williamson.

== Health and welfare work ==
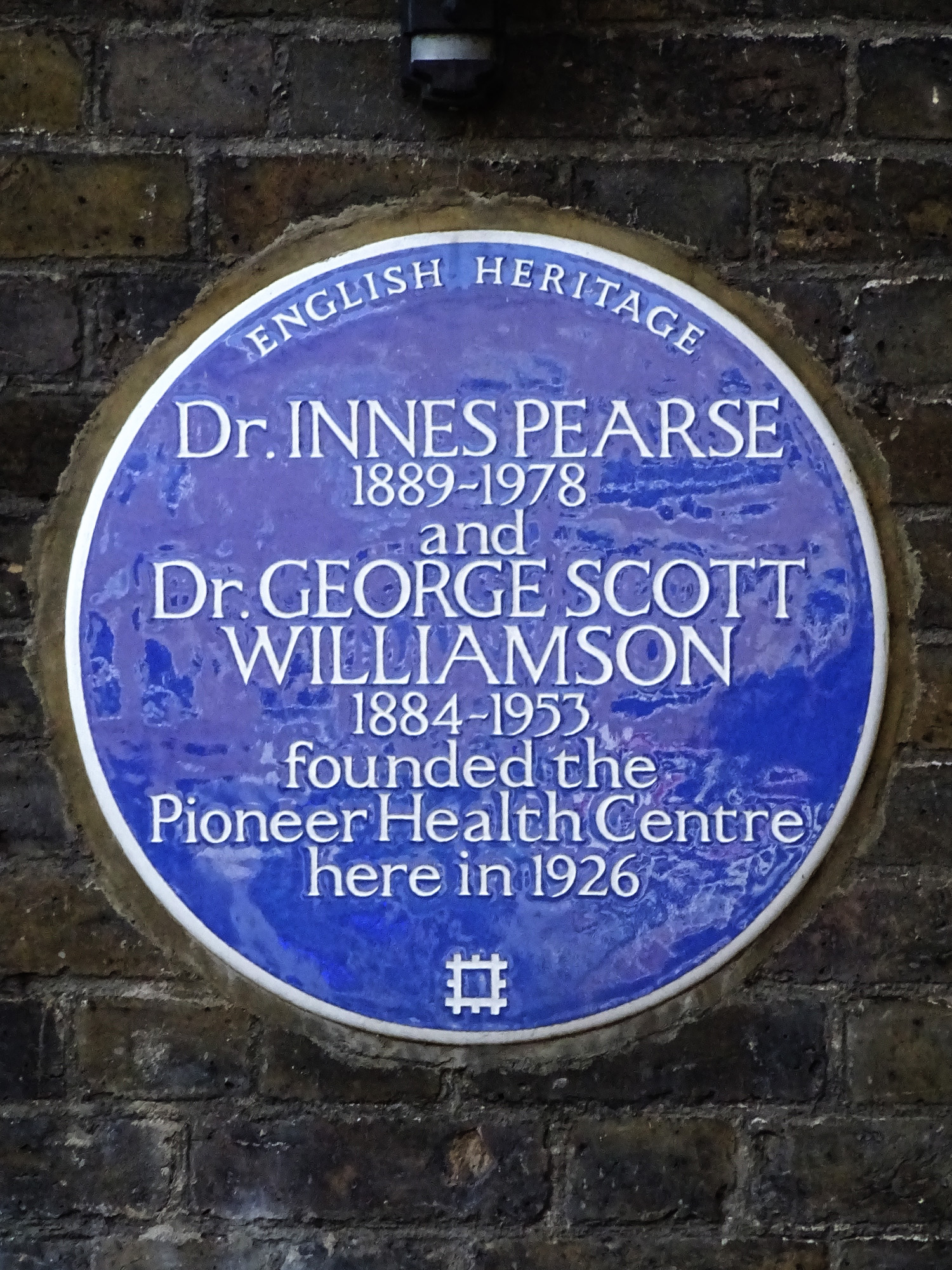
Plaque showing where Pearse and Williamson founded the Pioneer Health Centre in 1926

Pearse's work in infant welfare brought her to the attention of a group wanting to help working-class women access contraception. From 1924, she held discussions with that group at the Royal Free, which drew her and Williamson into the question of public health. Out of this the Pioneer Health Centre was born: first in a modest house in Peckham, and later in a modern architect-designed building opened in 1935. The project, presented as a "family club" with leisure activities and also health "overhauls", became known as the Peckham Experiment.

Pearse thought doctors and others needed to take a "deeper look at the natural laws governing health in human society". and that the medical profession should not be "overly focused on illness" but should also prioritise "understanding, evaluating, and cultivating health". She believed strongly in leaving responsibility with the individual and, in this spirit, doctors at the Pioneer Centre gave health checks and medical information but left people to decide what to do, whether to seek treatment etc. She did not agree with "welfare" models that meant offering piecemeal help, with no thought of self-reliance.

Pearse always saw the individual human, and the idea of "positive health", in the context of family and society. This fitted with a generally holistic approach adopted by both Pearse and Williamson, leading to an interest in organic food which they hoped would compensate for the poor quality of food generally available in Peckham. From 1935 Pearse leased Oakley Farm in Bromley, Kent, where organic food was grown for members of the Health Centre. When she and Williamson were in Kent they lived at the farm as a couple. They were founder members of the Soil Association and their work was an influence on Lady Eve Balfour, its first president.

During the Second World War, Pearse proposed a "homestead" scheme for mothers and children whose menfolk were away at war. She believed they could live healthily and productively in farm communities. A few families from Peckham did go to live at Oakley Farm during the war until it was requisitioned by the RAF. The farm was taken over around 1950 by Mary Langman who had been secretary at Peckham and who was another founder member of the Soil Association. The Peckham Experiment came to an end in 1950, when it proved to be incompatible with the new National Health Service which was more concerned with treating illness than with nurturing good health, and which had less interest in community and self-reliance.

== Publications ==
Professionally, she was generally known as Innes H. Pearse. Pearse published various books and articles, several co-authored with Williamson, including papers on their thyroid research in the 1920s. She also promoted her ideas through talks and articles in regional newspapers.

- 1931 The Case for Action: a survey of everyday life under modern industrial conditions, with special reference to the question of health, with G.S. Williamson
- 1942 The Peckham experiment: a study in the living structure of society, with Lucy Crocker
- 1944 Observations on the population question: a memorandum presented to the Royal Commission on population by Innes H. Pearse
- 1947 Biologists in Search of Material, with G.S. Williamson
- 1951 The Passing of Peckham, with G.S. Williamson
- 1979 The Quality of Life: the Peckham Approach to Human Ethology

Pearse prepared Williamson's theoretical Science, Synthesis and Sanity for publication in 1965 and worked on her own "reflective" book The Quality of Life, which was published posthumously.

== Legacy ==
The Peckham Experiment continued to be re-published into the 21st century and the Peckham Experiment continued to be discussed. The Pioneer Health Foundation (also known as the Pioneer Health Centre Ltd.) also took some of Pearse's and Williamson's ideas forward.

In 2009, a blue plaque was erected on the building where Pearse and Williamson founded the Pioneer Health Centre.

== Personal life ==
Pearse married Williamson on 20 February 1950 in Bromley. They lived together at the Mill House, Argos Hill, Rotherfield, Sussex until Williamson's death three years later. Pearse died at the Mill House on 25 December 1978.
