= John Pizzarelli Salutes Johnny Mercer: Live at Birdland =

Live album by John Pizzarelli
- Released: 2015
- Recorded: 2014
- Venue: Birdland, New York
- Genre: Jazz
- Label: Vector

John Pizzarelli chronology
Double Exposure (2012)	John Pizzarelli Salutes Johnny Mercer: Live at Birdland (2015)	Midnight McCartney (2015)

John Pizzarelli Salutes Johnny Mercer: Live at Birdland is a tribute album by John Pizzarelli to American songwriter Johnny Mercer. It was recorded live at the Birdland jazz club in New York in 2014, and released in 2015 by his Vector Records label. The album was recorded as a medley, interspersed with commentary by Pizzarelli.

== Background ==
Pizzarelli had performed Johnny Mercer tunes on previous albums, and as a cast member of the 1997 Broadway musical Dream. Pizzarelli explained the album dedicated to Mercer was significant given Mercer was "responsible for so many great things in [his] life."

== Reception ==
Christopher Loudon wrote in JazzTimes, "Pizzarelli manages to squeeze a remarkably panoptic homage into 65 minutes, covering 26 Mercer tunes, familiar and obscure, from all stages of his career...[Pizzarelli] remains the Dorian Gray of jazz, his sound and sensibility preternaturally boyish, joyously championing an art he was, quite literally, born into."

For Vintage Guitar magazine, Rich Kienzle wrote, "[o]n 'I Got Out of Bed on the Right Side' and 'Goody Goody' Pizzarelli offers the usual Bensonesque scat-guitar solos. 'Dearly Beloved' features a crisp, single-string break. He comps as flawlessly as his dad, Bucky, on 'Accentuate the Positive', 'Skylark', and 'Too Marvelous for Words'...Lesser-known gems like the swing-era 'Jamboree Jones' and 'Slue Foot' also get their due. While 'Something's Gotta Give' features driving single-string work, his solo on 'Emily' is a model of brevity and eloquence."

== Track listing ==
All tracks are written by Johnny Mercer.

No.	Title	Length
1.	"I Got Out of Bed on the Right Side"	3:50
2.	"Intro Dearly Beloved" (commentary)	0:28
3.	"Dearly Beloved"	4:22
4.	"Goody Goody"	4:03
5.	"You Medley"	7:22
6.	"Skylark"	3:53
7.	"Intro" (commentary)	0:26
8.	"I'm Old Fashioned"	2:31
9.	"Jamboree Jones"	3:14
10.	"Emily"	3:11
11.	"Accentuate the Positive"	5:12
12.	"Academy Award Medley"	3:47
13.	"Slue Foot"	3:11
14.	"Intro" (commentary)	0:31
15.	"October Medley"	5:33
16.	"Intro" (commentary)	0:21
17.	"Something's Gotta Give"	4:09
18.	"Empty Tables"	2:56
19.	"Too Marvelous for Words"	3:46
20.	"And So to Bed"	2:03

== Personnel ==
=== Musicians ===
- John Pizzarelli – guitar, vocals
- Budd Burridge – baritone saxophone, clarinet, bass clarinet
- Ken Hitchcock – alto saxophone, tenor saxophone, clarinet, flute
- John Mosca – trombone
- Konrad Paszkudzki – piano
- Martin Pizzarelli – bass
- Kevin Kanner – drums

=== Support ===
- Chris Byars – arrangement ("You Medly")
- Dick Lieb – arrangement ("Jamboree Jones")
- Don Sebesky – arrangement (all other tracks)
