= Sprouts (game) =

Paper-and-pencil topological game

Sprouts is an impartial paper-and-pencil game which can be analyzed for its mathematical properties. It was invented by mathematicians John Horton Conway and Michael S. Paterson at Cambridge University in the early 1960s. The setup is even simpler than the popular dots and boxes game, but gameplay develops much more artistically and organically.

== Rules ==
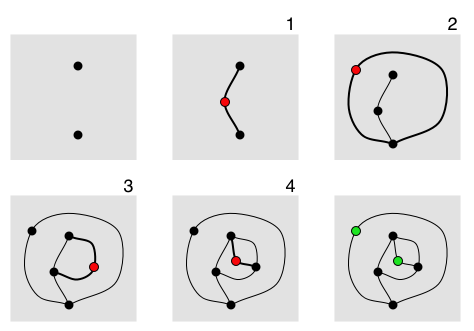
A 2-spot game of Sprouts. The game ends when the first player is unable to draw a connecting line between the only two free points, marked in green.

The game is played by two players, starting with a few spots drawn on a sheet of paper. Players take turns, where each turn consists of drawing a line between two spots (or from a spot to itself) and adding a new spot somewhere along the line. The players are constrained by the following rules:

- The line may be straight or curved, but must not touch or cross itself or any other line.
- The new spot cannot be placed on top of one of the endpoints of the new line. Thus the new spot splits the line into two shorter lines.
- No spot may have more than three lines attached to it. For the purposes of this rule, a line from the spot to itself counts as two attached lines and new spots are counted as having two lines already attached to them.
- You cannot touch a dot twice with one line then connect it to another.

In so-called normal play, the player who makes the last move wins. In misère play, the player who makes the last move loses. Misère Sprouts is perhaps the only misère combinatorial game that is played competitively in an organized forum.

The diagram on the right shows a 2-spot game of normal-play Sprouts. After the fourth move, most of the spots are dead–they have three lines attached to them, so they cannot be used as endpoints for a new line. There are two spots (shown in green) that are still alive, having fewer than three lines attached. However, it is impossible to make another move, because a line from a live spot to itself would make four attachments, and a line from one live spot to the other would cross lines. Therefore, no fifth move is possible, and the first player loses. Live spots at the end of the game are called survivors and play a key role in the analysis of Sprouts.

== Analysis of the game ==
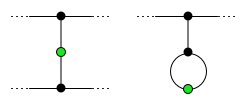
Analysis of a finished game: a live spot (green) is called a survivor. Its two neighbors (black) are dead spots.

Though the number of spots increases with every move, the game of Sprouts cannot go on forever. It has been mathematically proven that for a game starting with n spots, it must end in no more than 3n−1 moves, and no fewer than 2n moves. The reason the game must end is that the number of available connection points, or "lives", decreases with every turn.

A spot is considered "dead" when it has three lines attached to it and can no longer be used to make a move. Each spot begins with three "lives". Each move reduces the total number of lives in the game by one. This is because the move uses up two lives (one at each end of the new line) but creates a new spot which itself has only one remaining life. Therefore, a game that starts with n spots has a total of 3n lives available. After m moves, the number of remaining lives is 3n−m.

The game ends when there are no more valid moves. At this point, any spot that still has lives is called a survivor. A survivor must have only one life remaining (if it had two or more, a line could be drawn from the spot to itself). There must be at least one survivor—the spot created in the final move. Since the total number of remaining lives equals the total number of survivors, and there must be at least one survivor, the number of moves m must be less than 3n. More precisely, a game can last no more than 3n−1 moves. This maximum is often reached when one player tries to keep all the spots in a single connected group.

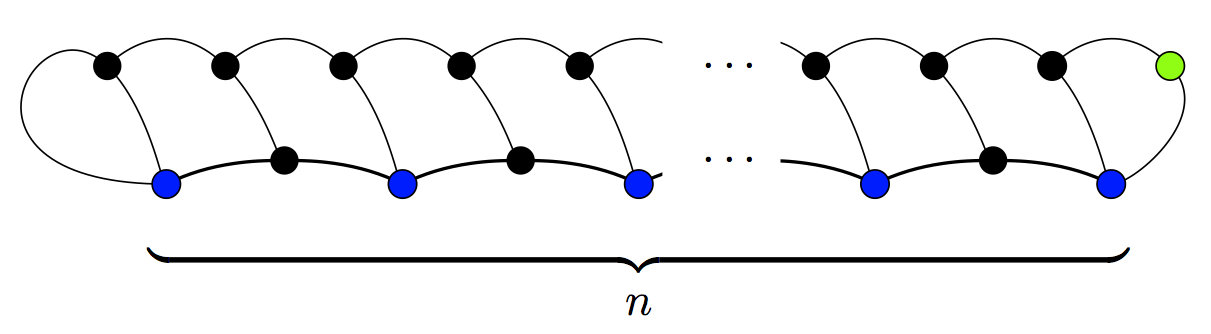
A game of sprouts with n initial spots (in blue) that ends in the maximum possible 3n−1 moves.

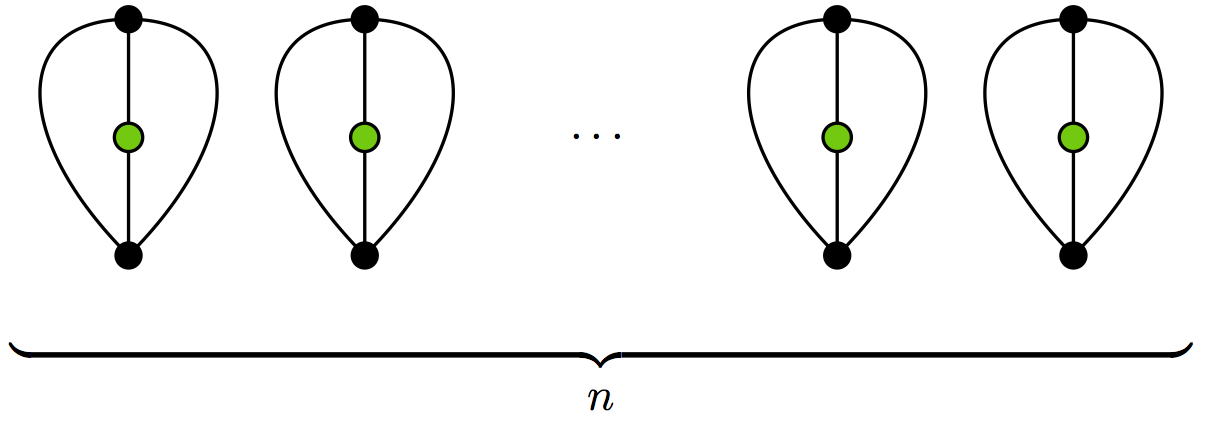
A game of sprouts with n initial spots that ends in the minimum possible 2n moves.

The minimum number of moves is 2n. This lower bound is often the result of a player trying to divide the playing area into many separate regions, forcing the game to end more quickly. Each enclosed region will contain at least one survivor, and each survivor has two "dead" neighbors that cannot be used by any other survivor. In the minimum-move game, the board is filled with these small groups and there are no other dead spots left over. These leftover dead spots, which are not neighbors of any survivor, are sometimes called pharisees (from the Hebrew for "separated ones"). The total number of moves in a game is directly related to the number of pharisees created.

Because the total number of moves is limited by these bounds, much of the strategy in Sprouts revolves around trying to influence the game's length. One player will try to create enclosed regions to shorten the game, while the other will try to keep the game open and create "pharisees" to lengthen it. Real games often become a battle over whether the final number of moves will be an even or odd number.

== Winning strategies ==
Since Sprouts is a finite game where no draw is possible, a perfect strategy exists either for the first or the second player, depending on the number of initial spots. The main question about a given starting position is then to determine which player can force a win if they play perfectly.

When the winning strategy is for the first player, it is said that the outcome of the position is a "win", and when the winning strategy is for the second player, it is said that the outcome of the position is a "loss" (because it is a loss from the point of view of the first player).

The outcome is determined by developing the game tree of the starting position. This can be done by hand only for a small number of spots, and all the new results since 1990 have been obtained by extensive search with computers.

=== Normal version ===
Winning Ways for your Mathematical Plays reports that the 6-spot normal game was proved to be a loss for the first player by Denis Mollison, who produced a 47-page hand analysis. For several decades this remained the largest position solved without computer assistance.

The first major computational advance was made in 1990 by David Applegate, Guy Jacobson, and Daniel Sleator at Carnegie Mellon University. Their program, based on alpha–beta pruning with a string-based representation of Sprouts positions, determined the outcomes for all positions up to 11 spots. Based on these results, they formulated the Sprouts conjecture, stating that the first player wins exactly when

$$n \equiv 3,4,5 \pmod{6}$$.

In 2001, Riccardo Focardi and Flamina Luccio described a method to prove by hand that the normal 7-spot game is a loss.

A second major leap came from Lemoine and Viennot, who introduced the use of nimbers (Grundy numbers) to exploit the natural decomposition of Sprouts positions. In 2007, they solved all positions up to 32 spots. In 2010–2011, they extended the record to all positions up to 44 spots, and three isolated cases at 46, 47, and 53 spots.

In 2025, Čížek, Balko, and Schmid introduced SPOTS, a massively parallel solver based on proof-number search with distributed-memory parallelism and nimber-based reductions. Their solver established 42 previously unknown outcomes, raising the number of solved n-spot positions from 47 to 89.

All newly computed outcomes are consistent with the Sprouts conjecture (W = first-player win, L = loss):

n	Outcome	Authors
1	L	Conway
2	L	Conway
3	W	Conway
4	W	Mollison
5	W	Mollison
6	L	Mollison
7	L	Applegate, Jacobson & Sleator
8	L	Applegate, Jacobson & Sleator
9	W	Applegate, Jacobson & Sleator
10	W	Applegate, Jacobson & Sleator
11	W	Applegate, Jacobson & Sleator
12	L	Purinton
13	L	Purinton
14	L	Purinton
15	W	Lemoine & Viennot
16	W	Lemoine & Viennot
17	W	Lemoine & Viennot
18	L	Lemoine & Viennot
19	L	Lemoine & Viennot
20	L	Lemoine & Viennot
21	W	Lemoine & Viennot
22	W	Lemoine & Viennot
23	W	Lemoine & Viennot
24	L	Lemoine & Viennot
25	L	Lemoine & Viennot
26	L	Lemoine & Viennot
27	W	Lemoine & Viennot
28	W	Lemoine & Viennot
29	W	Lemoine & Viennot
30	L	Lemoine & Viennot
31	L	Lemoine & Viennot
32	L	Lemoine & Viennot
33	W	Lemoine & Viennot
34	W	Lemoine & Viennot
35	W	Lemoine & Viennot

n	Outcome	Authors
36	L	Lemoine & Viennot
37	L	Lemoine & Viennot
38	L	Lemoine & Viennot
39	W	Lemoine & Viennot
40	W	Lemoine & Viennot
41	W	Lemoine & Viennot
42	L	Lemoine & Viennot
43	L	Lemoine & Viennot
44	L	Lemoine & Viennot
45	W	Čížek, Balko & Schmid
46	W	Lemoine & Viennot
47	W	Lemoine & Viennot
48	L	Čížek, Balko & Schmid
49	L	Čížek, Balko & Schmid
50	L	Čížek, Balko & Schmid
51	W	Čížek, Balko & Schmid
52	W	Čížek, Balko & Schmid
53	W	Lemoine & Viennot
54	L	Čížek, Balko & Schmid
55	L	Čížek, Balko & Schmid
56	L	Čížek, Balko & Schmid
57	W	Čížek, Balko & Schmid
58	W	Čížek, Balko & Schmid
59	W	Čížek, Balko & Schmid
60	L	Čížek, Balko & Schmid
61	L	Čížek, Balko & Schmid
62	L	Čížek, Balko & Schmid
63	—	—
64	W	Čížek, Balko & Schmid
65	W	Čížek, Balko & Schmid
66	—	—
67	L	Čížek, Balko & Schmid
68	L	Čížek, Balko & Schmid
69	—	—
70	W	Čížek, Balko & Schmid

n	Outcome	Authors
71	W	Čížek, Balko & Schmid
72	—	—
73	L	Čížek, Balko & Schmid
74	L	Čížek, Balko & Schmid
75	—	—
76	W	Čížek, Balko & Schmid
77	W	Čížek, Balko & Schmid
78	—	—
79	L	Čížek, Balko & Schmid
80	L	Čížek, Balko & Schmid
81	—	—
82	W	Čížek, Balko & Schmid
83	W	Čížek, Balko & Schmid
84	—	—
85	L	Čížek, Balko & Schmid
86	L	Čížek, Balko & Schmid
87	—	—
88	W	Čížek, Balko & Schmid
89	W	Čížek, Balko & Schmid
90	—	—
91	L	Čížek, Balko & Schmid
92	L	Čížek, Balko & Schmid
93	—	—
94	W	Čížek, Balko & Schmid
95	W	Čížek, Balko & Schmid
96	—	—
97	L	Čížek, Balko & Schmid
98	L	Čížek, Balko & Schmid
99	—	—
100	W	Čížek, Balko & Schmid
101	—	—
102	—	—
103	L	Čížek, Balko & Schmid
104	L	Čížek, Balko & Schmid
105	—	—

=== Misère version ===
The computation history of the misère version of Sprouts is very similar to that of the normal version, with the same people involved. However, the misère version is more difficult to compute, and progress has been significantly slower.

In 1990, Applegate, Jacobson and Sleator reached up to nine spots. Based on their results, they conjectured that the outcome follows a regular pattern of period five. However, this conjecture was invalidated in 2007 when Josh Jordan and Roman Khorkov extended the misère analysis up to 12 spots: the 12-spot misère game is a win, and not the conjectured loss. The same team reached up to 16 spots in 2009. The same year, Julien Lemoine and Simon Viennot reached 17 spots with complicated algorithms. They were able to extend their analysis up to 20 points in 2011.

The results for misère play are now conjectured to follow a pattern of length six with some exceptional values: the first player wins in misère Sprouts when the remainder (mod 6) is zero, four, or five, except that the first player wins the one-spot game and loses the four-spot game. The table below shows the pattern, with the two irregular values in bold.

**Spots**	0	1	2	3	4	5	6	7	8	9	10	11	12	13	14	15	...
**Misère Outcome**	Win	**Win**	Loss	Loss	**Loss**	Win	Win	Loss	Loss	Loss	Win	Win	Win	Loss	Loss	Loss	...

== Brussels Sprouts ==
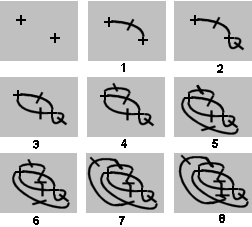
A 2-cross game of Brussels Sprouts always lasts exactly eight moves

A variant of the game, named Brussels Sprouts after the cruciferous vegetable, starts with a number of crosses, i.e. spots with four free ends. Each move involves joining two free ends with a curve, again not crossing any existing line, and then putting a short stroke across the line to create two new free ends. This game is finite, and the total number of moves (and thus the game's winner) is predetermined by the initial number of crosses: the players cannot affect the result by their play. Thus, this variant may be termed, after Conway's categorisation of mathematics itself, a "one player game".

Each move removes two free ends and introduces two more. Nonetheless, the game is bound to end as some free ends become isolated. With n initial crosses, the number of moves will, remarkably, always be 5n−2. Consequently, a game starting with an odd number of crosses will be a first player win, while a game starting with an even number will be a second player win regardless of the moves.

To prove this, first, we argue the game must end. Then, we will calculate precisely how many moves it needs to end. The game outcome is then implied, as already described.

Treat each cross as a graph with 5 vertices and 4 edges. In the starting position with n crosses, we have a planar graph with v = 5n vertices, e = 4n edges, f = 1 face, and k = n connected components. The Euler characteristic for connected planar graphs is 2. In a disconnected planar graph, we get

$1+k = f-e+v$

After m moves, we have:

- e = 4n + 4m since at each move, the player adds 4 edges.
- v = 5n + 3m since at each move, the player adds 3 vertices.

Then by the above, we have

- f − k = 1 + e − v = 1 − n + m

Next, note that every time we add a cross, we are ensuring that each side of this cross ends up with a degree 1 vertex. Thus, throughout the game, every face has at least one degree 1 vertex. Yet, the number of degree 1 vertices is invariant throughout the game, and remains at 4n. Hence, f is at most 4n.

From this, we see m = f − k − 1 + n is at most 5n − 2 (since k is at least 1 and f is at most 4n). So the game must terminate, and it must terminate in at most 5n − 2 moves. Now, we argue it must terminate in exactly 5n − 2 moves.

In the final configuration, no face can have more than one degree 1 vertex, since otherwise, we could connect them with a cross and there would still be a legal move. Every face has at least one such vertex, so it must end with exactly one such vertex. So in the final configuration, f is exactly 4n.

Similarly, in the final configuration, the graph must be connected, since the outer face gets at least one degree 1 vertex per connected component, and cannot have more than one such vertex. So, in the final configuration, k is exactly 1.

Thus, to obtain the final configuration, we must have had m = f−k−1+n = 4n−1−1+n = 5n−2.

A combination of standard Sprouts and Brussels Sprouts can also be played. The game starts with an arbitrary number (n) of dots or crosses. At each turn, the player chooses to add either a dot, or a cross, along the line they have just drawn. The duration of the game lays between (2n) and (5n − 2), depending on the number of dots or crosses having been added.

For n = 1, starting with a dot, the game will end after 2 moves. Starting with a cross, it will end after 2 moves if the first player adds a dot, after 3 moves if they add a cross: hence the first player has a winning strategy for both the normal and the misère version. For n > 1, the analysis is not completed.

== In popular culture ==
The game of Sprouts is a key plot element in the 1969 Nebula Award-nominated science fiction novel Macroscope by Piers Anthony. The protagonist, Ivo, is exceptionally skilled at the game, and his ability is used as a measure of his intelligence and creativity. The novel's characters play Sprouts as a high-level intellectual challenge, and the book includes diagrams of games in progress and discusses the game's psychological aspects.
