= Protactinium nitride =

Names
- Other names Protactinium mononitride, protactinium(III) nitride

Identifiers
CAS Number	66651-35-2
3D model (JSmol)	Interactive image
- InChI: InChI=1S/N.Pa/q-3;+3 Key: FXGLGDPQXNUWTM-UHFFFAOYSA-N
- SMILES: [Pa+3].[N-3]

Properties
Chemical formula	PaN
Molar mass	245.043 g·mol^{−1}
Appearance	crystals
Density	12.6 g/cm^{3}
Melting point	2,227 °C (4,041 °F; 2,500 K)
- Except where otherwise noted, data are given for materials in their standard state (at 25 °C [77 °F], 100 kPa). Infobox references

Protactinium nitride is a binary inorganic compound of protactinium and nitrogen with the chemical formula PaN.

== Synthesis ==
The compound can be obtained from the reaction of protactinium metal and nitrogen:

2 Pa + N_{2} → 2 PaN

Also by heating protactinium tetrachloride or pentachloride in ammonia gas.

== Physical properties ==
PaN crystals are of the cubic system with Fm3m space group.
