= Pan (Riccio) =

1510s bronze sculpture

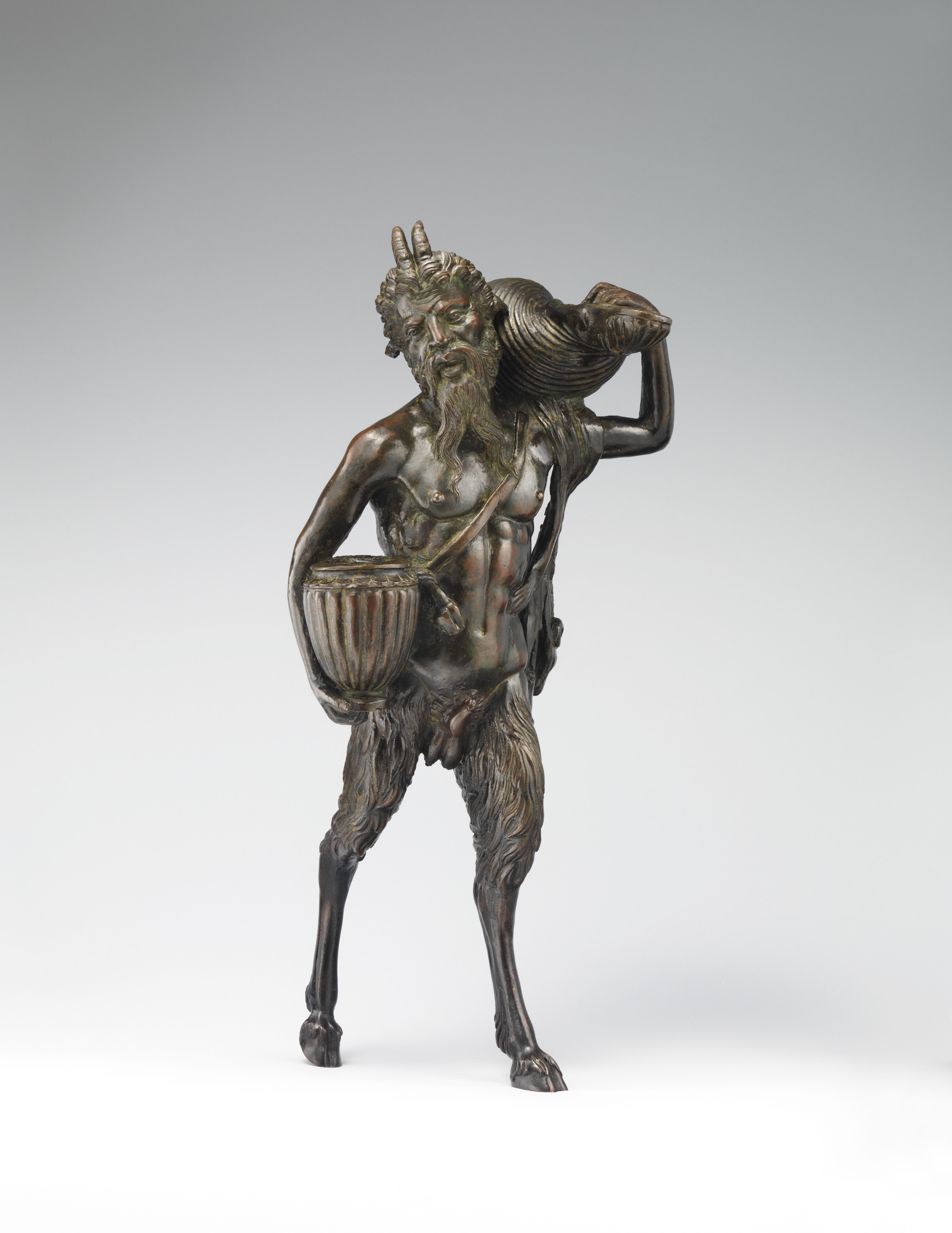
- Year: 1510s
- Medium: bronze
- Location: Metropolitan Museum of Art
- Accession No.: 1982.45
- Identifiers: The Met object ID: 206918

Pan is a 1510s bronze sculpture by Andrea Riccio. It is in the collection of the Metropolitan Museum of Art.

== Description and interpretation ==
The work depicts Pan. One art critic stated a belief that the drawings of Bernardo Parentino were a particular inspiration for this work.

== Later history and influence ==
Art historians have debated the creator of this work. Wilhelm von Bode was the first to propose that Riccio created this Pan and Leo Planiscig, expert on North Italian bronzes, stated agreement.
