= Dots and boxes =

2 player paper and pencil game

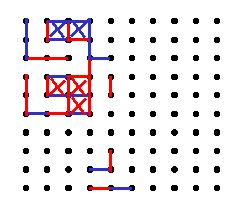
A game of dots and boxes

Dots and boxes is a pencil-and-paper game for two players (sometimes more). It was first published in the 19th century by French mathematician Édouard Lucas, who called it la pipopipette. It has gone by many other names, including dots and dashes, game of dots, dot to dot grid, boxes, and pigs in a pen.

The game starts with an empty grid of dots. Usually two players take turns adding a single horizontal or vertical line between two unjoined adjacent dots. A player who completes the fourth side of a 1×1 box earns one point and takes another turn. A point is typically recorded by placing a mark that identifies the player in the box, such as an initial. The game ends when no more lines can be placed. The winner is the player with the most points. The board may be of any size grid. When short on time, or to learn the game, a 2×2 board (3×3 dots) is suitable. A 5×5 board, on the other hand, is good for experts.

== Strategy ==
Example game of Dots and Boxes on a 2×2 square board. The second player ("B") plays a rotated mirror image of the first player's moves, hoping to divide the board into two pieces and tie the game. But the first player ("A") makes a sacrifice at move 7 and B accepts the sacrifice, getting one box. However, B must now add another line, and so B connects the center dot to the center-right dot, causing the remaining unscored boxes to be joined in a chain (shown at the end of move 8). With A's next move, A gets all three of them and ends the game, winning 3–1.

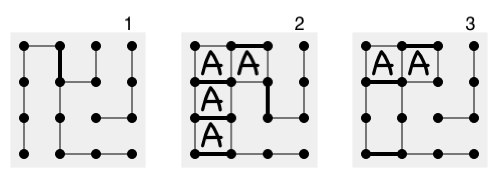
The "double-cross" strategy: faced with position 1, a novice player would create position 2 and lose. An experienced player would create position 3 and win.

For most novice players, the game begins with a phase of more-or-less randomly connecting dots, where the only strategy is to avoid adding the third side to any box. This continues until all the remaining (potential) boxes are joined into chains – groups of one or more adjacent boxes in which any move gives all the boxes in the chain to the opponent. At this point, players typically take all available boxes, then open the smallest available chain to their opponent. For example, a novice player faced with a situation like position 1 in the second diagram on the right, in which some boxes can be captured, may take all the boxes in the chain, resulting in position 2. But with their last move, they have to open the next, larger chain, and the novice loses the game.

A more experienced player faced with position 1 will instead play the double-cross strategy, taking all but 2 of the boxes in the chain and leaving position 3. The opponent will take these two boxes and then be forced to open the next chain. By achieving position 3, player A wins. The same double-cross strategy applies no matter how many long chains there are: a player using this strategy will take all but two boxes in each chain and take all the boxes in the last chain. If the chains are long enough, then this player will win.

The next level of strategic complexity, between experts who would both use the double-cross strategy (if they were allowed to), is a battle for control: an expert player tries to force their opponent to open the first long chain, because the player who first opens a long chain usually loses. Against a player who does not understand the concept of a sacrifice, the expert simply has to make the correct number of sacrifices to encourage the opponent to hand them the first chain long enough to ensure a win. If the other player also sacrifices, the expert has to additionally manipulate the number of available sacrifices through earlier play.

In combinatorial game theory, Dots and Boxes is an impartial game and many positions can be analyzed using Sprague–Grundy theory. However, Dots and Boxes lacks the normal play convention of most impartial games (where the last player to move wins), which complicates the analysis considerably. Playing Dots and Boxes optimally is PSPACE-complete.

== Unusual grids and variants ==
Dots and Boxes need not be played on a rectangular grid – it can be played on a triangular grid or a hexagonal grid.

Dots and boxes has a dual graph form called "Strings-and-Coins". This game is played on a network of coins (vertices) joined by strings (edges). Players take turns cutting a string. When a cut leaves a coin with no strings, the player "pockets" the coin and takes another turn. The winner is the player who pockets the most coins. Strings-and-Coins can be played on an arbitrary graph.

In analyses of Dots and Boxes, a game that starts with outer lines already drawn is called a Swedish board while the standard version that starts fully blank is called an American board. An intermediate version with only the left and bottom sides starting with drawn lines is called an Icelandic board.

A related game is Dots, played by adding coloured dots to a blank grid, and joining them with straight or diagonal line in an attempt to surround an opponent's dots.

== See also ==
- Reversi – Strategy board game
- Sprouts (game) – Paper-and-pencil mathematical game
- Tic tac toe – Paper-and-pencil game for two players
