= Pan (Clune novel) =

2025 novel by Michael Clune

- 2025 Penguin Press book jacket
- Author: Michael Clune
- Audio read by: Michael Crouch
- Cover artist: Alexis Farabaugh
- Genre: Bildungsromans
- Set in: 1990s Chicago suburbs
- Publisher: Penguin Press
- Publication date: July 22, 2025
- Publication place: United States
- Media type: Print, eBook, Audio
- Pages: 336
- Awards: 2025 long listed, First novel prize, The Center for Fiction
- ISBN: 9780593834428
- OCLC: 1527689866
- Website: Official website

Pan is Michael Clune's first novel. It was published by Penguin Press during the summer of 2025. The story is about a precocious fifteen-year-old boy named Nicholas sent to live with his father in the suburbs of Chicago after his parents' divorce during the early 1990s. He is infatuated with someone at school, is experiencing extraordinary insights, and is having panic attacks.

== Plot summary ==
Sandra Newman, reviewing this novel for The Guardian, says that this book depicts an honest portrayal of mental illness and the teenage years. The book shows how these combined experiences can feel like a type of black magic, and then lends credence to the idea that that this might be true. The protagonist, Nicholas, is shown having abnormal experiences.

For example, he predicts minor occurrences such as an increase in the wind's velocity or someone saying a specific, but quite ordinary word. He thinks he is haunted by the sound of a dead mouse. Another boy uses a fantasy book to prognosticate. Also, a well-known song, "More Than a Feeling," becomes a supernatural connection, when described as having a door in the middle of it, like on an extraterrestrial aircraft.

Newman additionally says that Nicholas believes that his thoughts can leave his body and he fears floating away. His fifteen year old friends believe him. This makes them vulnerable to Ian, an older college student who creates a small cult. Ian specifically targets Nicholas, telling him they are the only ones who can have genuine thoughts.

Ian additionally says that the others in the group are "Hollows" who have "Solid Mind," which is a mechanical type of thinking that lacks a soul. Ian claims that the words coming from the "Hollows" contain an empty void. The group eventually starts performing rituals that include sex, drugs, and sacrificing animals. Then when Nicholas can no longer sleep, he "spirals toward psychosis."

== Languaging ==
Reviewers discuss the "beguiling" observations evident in Nick's thought processes.

Kaveh Akbar, reviewing for The New York Times says that Nicholas observes, while looking out a school window during "one February morning" that the "sun had lost its winter quality. In winter the sunlight stands apart from things. When the winter sun touches the brick of the path, it’s like a hand touching a cheek. But when the spring sun touches brick, it goes into it.'"

Sam Sacks, writing for The Wall Street Journal begins by quoting the narrative voice of Nick, "“When you’re fifteen, your body and mind are still tied to nature... [t]he seasons start inside you. God fashions the new season out of interior materials. You discover the season, now you’re performing it. You’re winter, you’re spring. And the things around start to mimic you. It’s why the change in seasons feels like prophecy.”

Matthew Specktor, of The Washington Post shows Nick's thoughts while in a classroom: "“Winter in Illinois, the flesh comes off the bones, what did we need geometry for? We could look at the naked angles of the trees, the circles in the sky at night. At noon we could look at our own faces. All the basic shapes were there, in bone.”
