= Double Exposure (John Pizzarelli album) =

Studio album by John Pizzarelli
- Released: May 15, 2012
- Recorded: 2011
- Studio: Jacob Burns Film Center, Pleasantville, NY, USA
- Genre: Jazz
- Length: 52:20
- Label: Telarc
- Producer: John Pizzarelli

John Pizzarelli chronology
Rockin' in Rhythm: A Tribute to Duke Ellington (2010)	Double Exposure (2012)	John Pizzarelli Salutes Johnny Mercer: Live at Birdland (2015)

Double Exposure is a vocal jazz album by John Pizzarelli, released in 2012 with Telarc. It consists of tributes to Pizzarelli's favorite songs from his adolescence, framed in traditional jazz arrangements.

== Track listing ==
No.	Title	Writer(s)	Length
1.	"I Feel Fine/Sidewinder"	John Lennon; Paul McCartney; Edward Lee Morgan	3:49
2.	"Harvest Moon"	Neil Young	5:19
3.	"Traffic Jam/The Kicker"	Joe Henderson; Jessica Molaskey; James Taylor	3:29
4.	"Ruby Baby"	Jerry Leiber; Mike Stoller	4:53
5.	"Alison"	Declan MacManus	3:56
6.	"Rosalinda's Eyes"	Billy Joel	4:02
7.	"In Memory of Elizabeth Reed"	Forrest Richard Betts	4:19
8.	"Drunk on the Moon/Lush Life"	Billy Strayhorn; Tom Waits	4:28
9.	"Walk Between the Raindrops"	Donald Fagen	5:10
10.	"Free Man in Paris"	Joni Mitchell	4:10
11.	"Take a Lot of Pictures"	Jessica Molaskey; John Pizzarelli	4:00
12.	"I Can Let Go Now"	Michael McDonald	2:47
13.	"Diamond Girl"	Darrell Crofts; Jimmy Seals	3:58

== Personnel ==
=== Musicians ===
- John Pizzarelli – 7-string guitar, guitar (classical), primary artist, vocals
- Tony Kadleck – flugelhorn, trumpet
- John Mosca – euphonium, trombone
- Kenny Berger – clarinet (bass), saxophone (baritone)
- Andy Fusco – clarinet, saxophone (alto), saxophone (tenor)
- Aaron Weinstein – violin
- Larry Fuller – piano, piano (electric)
- Larry Goldings – organ
- Martin Pizzarelli – bass
- Tony Tedesco – drums
- Jessica Molaskey – vocals

=== Support ===
- John Pizzarelli – liner notes, mastering, mixing, producer
- Larissa Collins – art direction
- Bill Moss – engineer, mastering, mixing
- Albert J. Roman – cover design, package design
- Thom O'Connor – assistant engineer

== Reception ==
Professional ratings
Review scores
Source	Rating
Allmusic	3.5/5 stars
Goldmine	4/5 stars
The Guardian: Jazz	4/5 stars
PopMatters	7/10 stars

Reception to the album was generally positive.

Dave Gelly for The Guardian summarised "[t]he arrangements are sharp and witty, the singing deceptively easygoing, and the guitar playing just terrific. It's a delight."

Rick Anderson commented for AllMusic that "[w]hat's charming about this album, beyond the sheer quality of the songs and the arrangements, is Pizzarelli's obvious and genuine love for this really broad gamut of material, and his insight into the varied qualities that make them all great songs."

Will Layman's review for the PopMatters magazine was more mixed, commenting "[t]he delightful singer and guitarist plays pop/rock material in his jazz style, managing a couple of miracles and few real misses."

And for the Boston Globe, Steve Greenlee wrote "[i]f you like Pizzarelli, you'll enjoy this immensely. If, however, you find his voice too thin and nasally, then “Double Exposure” won't win you over."
