= Paper-and-pencil game =

Game only requiring writing

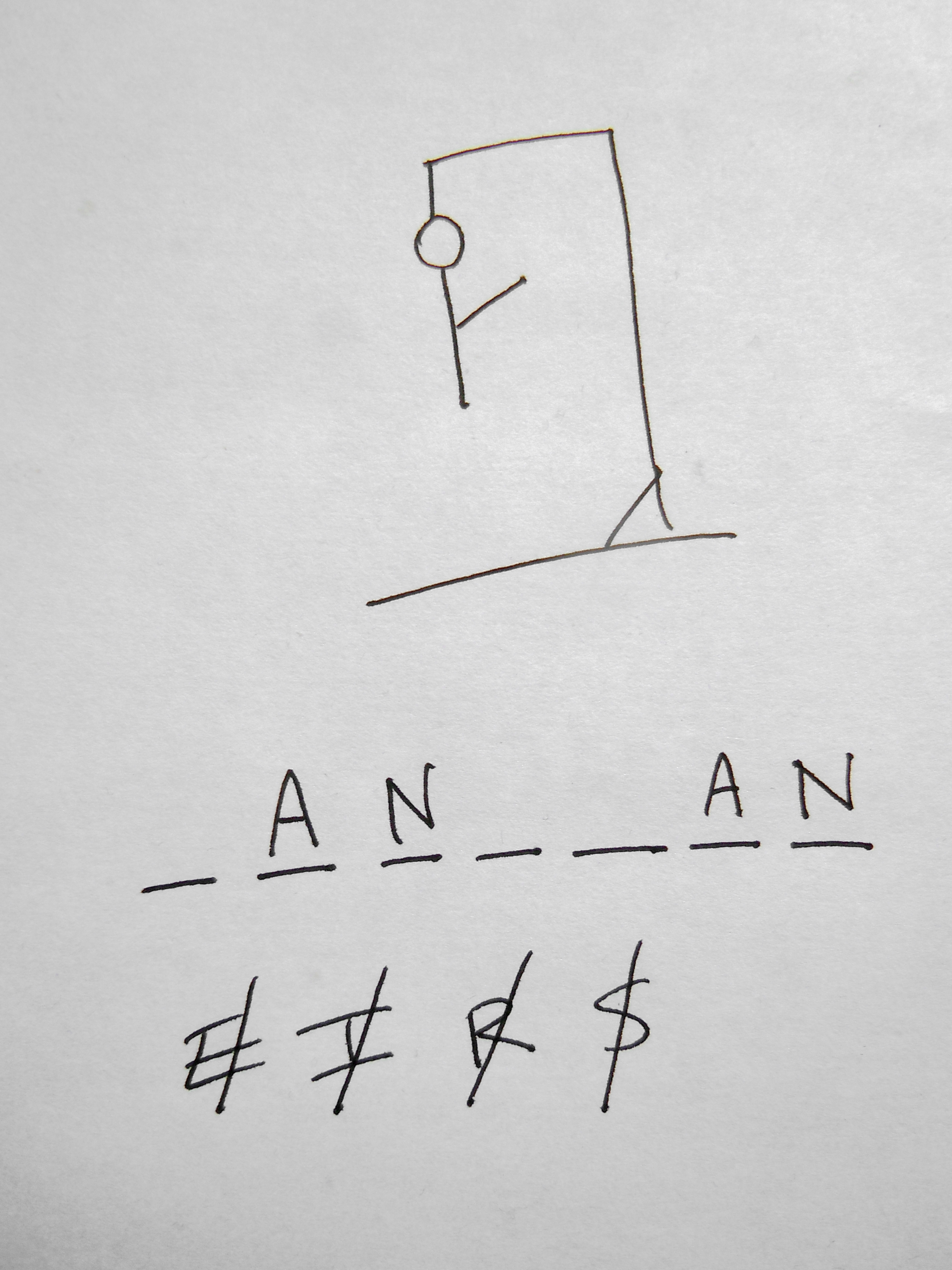
Hangman, a simple pen-and-paper game

Paper-and-pencil games or paper-and-pen games (or some variation on those terms) are games that can be played solely with paper and pencils (or other writing implements), usually without erasing. They may be played to pass the time, as icebreakers, or for brain training. In recent times, they have been supplanted by mobile games. Some popular examples of pencil-and-paper games include tic-tac-toe, sprouts, dots and boxes, hangman, MASH, paper soccer, and spellbinder. The term is unrelated to the use in role-playing games to differentiate tabletop games from role-playing video games.

Board games where pieces are never moved or removed from the board once being played, particularly abstract strategy games like Gomoku and Connect Four, can also be played as pencil-and-paper games.
