= Collegiate Association of Table Top Gamers =

Organization

- Abbreviation: CATTG
- Formation: 2006-02-09
- Type: INGO
- Headquarters: World Wide Web
- Members: College Clubs
- Executive Director: Mike Roselli
- Website: CATTG

The CATTG Philanthropy Program
- Purpose: Philanthropy
- Method: Fund Raising, Volunteering

The Collegiate Association of Table Top Gamers (CATTG), was an international college-student run organization for table top gaming clubs at universities whose interests span (but are not limited to) paper and pencil RPGs, collectible card games, and board games of all shapes and sizes. There are currently fifteen official chapters, all of which run themselves individually, but collaborate to keep the network strong. All activities are done in a non-profit manner, and the organization affiliates its activities and goals with other non-profit organizations such as the Ronald McDonald House, Toys for Tots, and various other philanthropic programs and events such as cancer walks.

Representatives from each university plan trips, conventions, and other events and members from the clubs are receptive to other gamers from other universities due to the foundation of a network based on the common interest of gaming. Companies are also welcome and have showcased products at club meetings.

The organization, founded by J.C. Clare and Tom Elliott, started as an individual club at Fort Hays State University, Kansas when it was approved by the Student Government Association there on November 21, 2003. In 2005, current Executive Director Mike Roselli (NCSU) contacted former President Logan Bonner (FHSU) and after a series of meetings, a new CATTG Chapter was ready to be instituted. On February 9, 2006, the organization grew to a national level when the second CATTG chapter was founded at North Carolina State University.

As of 2009, the organization has grown to thirteen chapters, spreading to colleges all over the United States. With a goal to encourage and facilitate the creation and survival of table top gaming clubs and the values of "Integrity, Respect, Growth, Fun, and Charity", the organization has received much notoriety in the college gaming demographic, with numerous online articles written about the organization and its clubs.

== Requirements ==
There are no financial requirements at this time. All university gaming clubs are eligible to join, provided they are a registered club at their school and they have a constitution. One of the club's primary interests must be table top games, though they are encouraged to include other interests as they see fit.

Each club must have a board member, to provide equal representation for the organization. This position is defaulted to the club president, however, the president may appoint someone else for the task. The Board Member votes to decide organization matters. All other operations are run on a chapter-by-chapter basis. While one chapter can look to another for assistance, each club is its own, independent organization that uses CATTG as a college-gaming networking tool, and can remove itself from it at any time.

== Programs ==
CATTG runs a few programs nationally. One of these is the Scholarship Program, which makes an effort to link student gamers with potential scholarships relating to table top games.

The Philanthropy Program is an effort to contribute to the gaming community by encouraging the chapters to create and work on philanthropic projects in the field of table top gaming. Activities can be created by chapters, submitted by sponsors, or requested by charities and causes. Each activity is measured in man-hours or dollars-donated. An up-to-date list of statistics for this program is available on the website.

In support of the Philanthropy and Scholarship Programs, the Sponsor Program was born. Through this program, CATTG wishes to network with companies in the field of gaming, keep good communications with these companies to share information about the organization and the programs, and gain chapters materials for their contributions through the Philanthropy Program.

== In The Press ==
The organization has been mentioned in online sources. The following are articles pertaining to the organization, in order of printing.

- Econocon 2008 (PSU, 4/21/08)
- Advancing Toward Charity (NCSU, 3/10/08)
- MUG @ Red Hawk Nite (MSU, 9/27/07)
- New budget aids gamers (Hofstra, 5/3/07)
- Making magic (NCSU, 3/27/07)
- Views vary on technology (WKU, 2/22/07)
- Club assists Toys for Tots (NCSU, 11/16/06)
- PSU assists cancer walk (PSU, 11/03/06)
- Students duel with wizards (NCSU, 9/11/06)
- PSU EconoCon Held (PSU, 4/21/06)
- Hofstra University Gamers (Hofstra, April 04)
- New club, Risk Tournament (FHSU, 3/11/04)
- PSU Gaming Holds Con (PSU, 5/03/03)
