= Davis Conference Center =

- Interactive map of Davis Conference Center
- Location: Layton, Utah, United States
- Coordinates: 41°05′06″N 111°58′52″W
- Owner: Davis County
- Operator: Western States Lodging & Management
- Type: Conference Centre
- Acreage: 70,000-square-foot

Construction
- Opened: 2004

The Davis Conference Center is a conference center with over 70,000-square-feet of flexible meeting space located in Layton, Utah, United States. The center, which hosts 700 groups a year, is unique in that it offers exhibit space, conference space and an adjoining hotel for lodging. In the conference's first year it hosted 726 events. The conference center is attached to a Hilton Garden Inn, owned by Kevin Garn, and within walking distance to several hotels, the Layton Hills Mall, and restaurants. The Davis Conference Center features event spaces of different sizes, the biggest of which is a 12,500-square-foot ballroom with a 1,000 person capacity.

Two 85-foot-tall towers are mounted with LED light strips that indicate future weather forecasts.
