= Pan Pan =

Pan Pan may refer to:

== Animals ==
- Pan Pan (giant panda) (1985–2016), Chinese giant panda

== Fictional characters ==
- Pan Pan, a character from the web animation Homestar Runner
- Pan Pan, a character from the Cartoon Network series We Bare Bears

== History ==
- Pan Pan (kingdom), an ancient Hindu kingdom
- Panhard 178, a French armoured car nick-named Pan-Pan

== People ==
- Sharon Yeung Pan Pan (born 1958), Taiwanese actress and film producer
- Pan Pan (badminton) (born 1986), Chinese badminton player
- Pang Panpan (born 1988), Chinese gymnast
- Pangina Heals (born 1988, Pan Pan Narkprasert), Thai drag queen

== Society ==
- Pan-pan, an urgency call
- Panpan girls, sex workers in postwar Japan
