= Pan (game) =

Polish card game

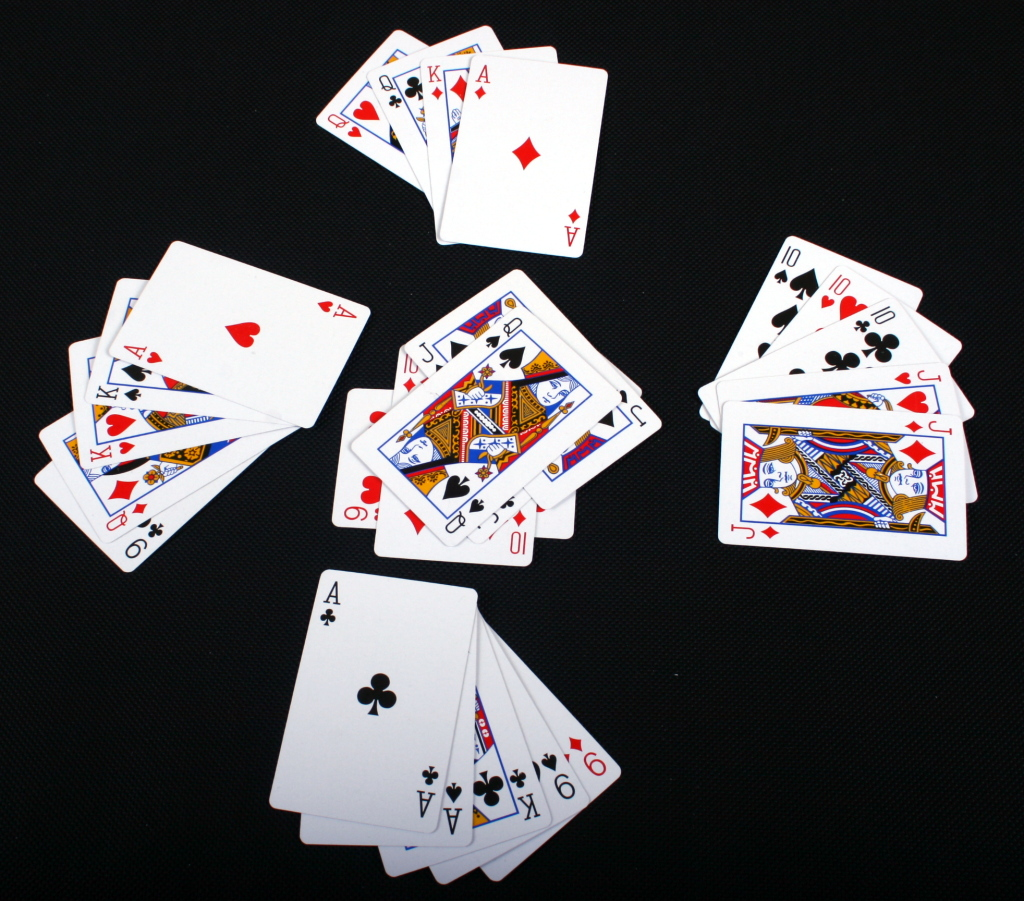
- Origin: Poland
- Type: Shedding-type
- Players: 2-8
- Skills: Tactics
- Cards: 24
- Deck: French
- Rank (high→low): A K Q J 10 9
- Play: Clockwise
- Playing time: Various
- Chance: Medium

Pan is a card game of Polish origin, using a small French pack (cards from 9 to A are used). Whoever gets rid of their cards first wins the game but one can play only cards of higher or equal value than the one at the top of the stack.

All cards are dealt evenly to each of the players. The player that gets nine of Hearts starts the game by placing the card at the stack. Then the next player can play one, three or four cards of the same value, provided that they are of equal or higher value than the card at the top of the stack. If one can't play anything or they don't want to, they have to take three or more cards from the stack. If there are three cards or less at the stack, then the player has to take all the cards but the nine of Hearts at the bottom.

== Bibliography ==
1. "Pan - zasady gry - Kurnik". Kurnik (in Polish).
2. "Jak grać w Pana? 2 vs 2". tipy.interia.pl (in Polish).
