= Ion Award =

Board game design competition

The Ion Award is the largest board game design competition in the United States. It is held annually in Utah at the SaltCON board game convention. The competition started in 2009 for unpublished game designs, with the intent to bring designers and publishers together, and to recognize excellence in game design. The first Ion Awards had the support of national publishers including Eagle-Gryphon Games, Mayday Games, Rio Grande Games, and Out of the Box Publishing, and has continued to get national and international support.

The competition has received game design entries from all over the world. Board game designs that have won the Ion Award or have been selected as finalists have been published every year since its inception.

Each year local and international board game publishers are selected as judges for the competition, including longtime judges Eagle-Gryphon Games, Mayday Games, Gamelyn Games and others.

The competition has two rounds of judging. First all the entering designers submit rules, images, videos, and summaries of their unpublished game designs. Those entries are then reviewed by judges all over the world, and finalists are selected. The 4 finalists in each category are invited to attend the final round of judging at the SaltCON convention, where they present their game design in person to the final judges. After the final judging, the winners are announced at the Awards Ceremony at the convention.

The Ion Award at first featured only a single Best Game winner each year, but since 2011, it has featured both a Light Game category and a Strategy Game category.

Finalists are announced about a month before the live event. Winners are announced a few days after the final judging.

== Strategy Game Category Winners ==
- 2026 - Pocket Zoo - Corin Elliott
- 2025 - Magmapunk - Jeff Grisenthwaite
- 2024 - Plutocrats - Micah Sturr
- 2023 - Gempire: Zarmund's Demands - Paul Elpers
- 2022 - Clima - solving the climate crisis - Carlos Flores
- 2021 - Dynasty - Jason Riddell
- 2020 - Oros (Pangaea) - Brandt Brinkerhoff
- 2019 - Loads of Roads - Joshua, Nick, and Anthony Winegar
- 2018 - American Steel - Joshua Mills and Nat Levan
- 2017 - Palooka Precinct - Glen Dresser
- 2016 - Scarlet Pimpernel - Brian Kelley
- 2015 - Race to Innovation - Mike Holyoak
- 2014 - Xenon Profiteer - T. C. Petty, III
- 2013 - Nika - Josh Raab
- 2012 - Karesansui (Rocks) - Joseph Kisenwether
- 2011 - Pizza Theory - Greg Powers and Brian Powers

== Light Game Category Winners ==
- 2026 - On the Teche - Christopher Stelly
- 2025 - Wildcrafters - Katie Tam
- 2024 - Moon Bunny - Pauline Kong and Marie Wong
- 2023 - Gumball World - Aaron Kempkes
- 2022 - Capetalism - Chris Chan
- 2021 - Steam Up: A Feast of Dim Sum - Pauline Kong and Marie Wong
- 2020 - Super Truffle Pigs! - Jason Corace
- 2019 - The Night Cage - Rosswell Saunders, Chris McMahon, Chris Chan
- 2018 - The Deadlies (Seven Deadly Sins) - Paul Saxberg
- 2017 - Bad Doctor! - Eric Magnan & Dan Germachrin
- 2016 - Cypher - Adam Wyse
- 2015 - Stalag Escape - Matthew Jensen
- 2014 - Yardmaster (Payload) - Steven Aramini
- 2013 - Hold Your Breath - Daniel Jenkins & Christopher Urinko
- 2012 - Rigamaroles - Shane Larsen
- 2011 - Snake Eyes -T. Alex Davis

== Best Game Category Winners ==
- 2010 - (Title Withheld) - Jason Fullen
- 2009 - King's Vineyard - David Haslam and Sandeep Kharkar
