= Michael Jackson (disambiguation) =

Michael Jackson (1958–2009) was an American singer, songwriter, dancer and entertainer known as the "King of Pop".

Michael, Mike, or Mick Jackson may also refer to:

== People ==
=== Entertainment industry ===
==== Musicians ====
- Mike Jackson (musician) (1888–1945), American jazz pianist and composer
- Mike Jackson (Australian entertainer) (born 1946), Australian multi-instrumentalist, songwriter and children's entertainer
- Mick Jackson (singer) (born 1947), English singer-songwriter
- Michael Gregory (jazz guitarist) (born 1953), American jazz guitarist, born Michael Gregory Jackson
- Mike and Michelle Jackson, Australian multi-instrumental duo
- Michael Jackson (English singer) (born 1964), British singer with the heavy metal band Satan/Pariah
- Oh No (musician), birth name Michael Woodrow Jackson (born 1978), American rapper
- Michael Lee Jackson, American guitarist
- Mick Jackson (born 1950), bassist with British band Love Affair

==== Other people in the entertainment industry ====
- Michael Jackson (radio commentator) (1934–2022), American radio talk show host, KABC and KGIL, Los Angeles
- Michael Jackson (writer) (1942–2007), English beer and whisky expert, Beer Hunter show host
- Mick Jackson (director) (born 1943), British film and TV director, known for The Bodyguard
- Michael J. Jackson (born 1948), English actor from Liverpool, best known for his role in Brookside
- Michael James Jackson (1945–2022), American record producer, engineer and composer
- Michael Jackson (television executive) (born 1958), British television executive
- Mick Jackson (author) (born 1960), British writer, known for The Underground Man
- Mike Jackson (photographer) (born 1966), British abstract and landscape photographer, known for Poppit Sands images
- Michael Jackson (actor) (born 1970), Canadian actor
- Mike Jackson (film producer) (born 1972), American film producer and talent manager
- Michael R. Jackson (born 1981), American playwright, composer, and lyricist

=== Military and militants ===
- Michael Jackson (American soldier) (1734–1801), Continental Army general
- Mike Jackson (British Army officer) (1944–2024), former British Army Commander-in-Chief, Land Forces
- Salman Raduyev (1967–2002), Chechen warlord; nicknamed "Michael Jackson" for a time

=== Politicians and officials ===
- Mike Jackson (Texas politician) (born 1953), American politician, member of the Texas Senate
- Michael P. Jackson (born 1954), U.S. deputy secretary of Homeland Security, 2005–2007
- Michael W. Jackson (born 1963), American lawyer, Alabama district attorney
- Michael A. Jackson (politician) (born 1964), American politician, secretary of the Maryland State Police
- Mike Jackson (Oklahoma politician) (born 1978), American politician, member of the Oklahoma House of Representatives

=== Sportspeople ===
==== American football ====
- Michael Jackson (linebacker) (born 1957), American NFL linebacker (1979–1986)
- Michael Jackson (wide receiver) (1969–2017), American politician and NFL wide receiver
- Mike Jackson (cornerback) (born 1997)

==== Association football (soccer) ====
- Mike Jackson (footballer, born 1939), Scottish footballer and manager
- Michael Jackson (footballer, born 1963) (Mariléia dos Santos), Brazilian women's association footballer
- Mike Jackson (footballer, born 1973), English association football player born in Liverpool
- Michael Jackson (footballer, born 1980), English association football player born in Cheltenham

==== Other sports ====
- Mike Jackson (left-handed pitcher) (born 1946), American baseball player
- Mike Jackson (basketball) (born 1949), American ABA pro basketball player (1972–1976)
- Michael Jackson (basketball) (born 1964), American NBA pro basketball player, Sacramento Kings (1987–1990)
- Mike Jackson (right-handed pitcher) (born 1964), American baseball player
- Michael Jackson (rugby league) (born 1969), English rugby league footballer
- Mike Jackson (wrestler) (born 1949), American professional wrestler
- Mike Jackson (fighter) (born 1985), American mixed martial artist

=== Other people ===
- Michael A. Jackson (computer scientist) (born 1936), British software developer
- Michael Jackson (anthropologist) (born 1940), New Zealand professor of social anthropology and writer
- Mike Jackson (automotive) (born 1949), American businessman, former CEO of Mercedes-Benz USA and CEO of AutoNation
- Mike Jackson (systems scientist) (born 1951), British organizational theorist and consultant
- Michael Jackson (murderer) (1954–2026), American convicted murderer
- Mike Jackson (retailing) (born 1954), American businessman former president and COO of Supervalu
- Michael Jackson (bishop) (born 1956), Church of Ireland archbishop of Dublin, Ireland, since 2011
- Michael Jackson (journalist), Niuean journalist and former politician
- Michael Thomas Jackson (born 1948), British plant taxonomist
- Michael Jackson, American murderer convicted in the murder of Carol and Reggie Sumner

=== Characters ===
- Mike Jackson (character), in the Psmith books by P. G. Wodehouse

== Songs ==
- "Michael Jackson (The Beat Goes On)", by Cash Cash from The Beat Goes On
- "Michael Jackson", by Das Racist from Relax
- "Michael Jackson", by Fatboy Slim, B-side of "Going Out of My Head"
- "Michael Jackson", by The Mitchell Brothers
- "Michael Jackson", by Negativland from Escape from Noise

== See also ==
- Michael Jackson, Inc., a non-fiction book by Zack O'Malley Greenburg
- Michael L. Jackson (disambiguation)
- Jackson (surname)
