= Cascade Investment =

American holding and investment company

Cascade Investment, L.L.C.
- Type: Private
- Industry: Investments; Conglomerate
- Founded: 1995; 31 years ago
- Founder: Michael Larson
- Headquarters: Kirkland, Washington, United States
- Key people: Bill Gates (Chairman); Michael Larson (CIO)
- Total assets: US$70 billion (2021)
- Owner: Bill Gates
- Number of employees: 100
- Subsidiaries: Front Range Investment Holdings LLC; Cottonwood Management LLC; Lakeland Sands Florida, LLC
- Website: cascadeassetmanagement.com

Cascade Investment, L.L.C. is an American holding company and private investment firm headquartered in Kirkland, Washington, United States. It is controlled by Bill Gates, and managed by Michael Larson. More than half of Gates's fortune is held in assets outside his holding of Microsoft shares. Cascade is the successor company to Dominion Income Management, the former investment vehicle for Gates's holdings, which was managed by convicted felon Andrew Evans.

Larson reportedly directs Cascade's investments through Bill and Melinda Gates Investments, a firm that also manages the portfolios of the Gates Foundation and other connected entities. Larson accrued over the twenty years from 1995 an 11% compound annual return, and as of 2014 had 100 employees working under his direction. In 2021, Cascade drew attention due to allegations of toxic work environment caused by Larson.

With 269,000 acres of farmland (which has been historically countercyclical to the stock market) being held through a wide network of shell companies, Cascade Investment is the largest farmland owner in the United States.

Cascade has managed Gates' stake in Canadian National Railway since 2013. This constituted one of the investment firm's largest holdings. In 2022, the company sold $940 million worth of stocks, whittling Gates' stake down to 1.4 percent.

== Notable investments ==
Company	Ticker	Sector	Ownership (%)
Four Seasons Hotels and Resorts	Private	Hospitality	71.25%
Ecolab	NYSE: ECL	Conglomerate	25%
Canadian National Railway	TSX: CNR; NYSE: CNI	Rail transport	14.2%
FEMSA	BMV: FEMSA; NYSE: FMX	Beverage and Retail	
Berkshire Hathaway	NYSE: BRK.A; NYSE: BRK.B	Conglomerate	4%
Strategic Hotels & Resorts	Private	Hospitality	9.8%
Republic Services	NYSE: RSG	Waste management	34.1%
Deere & Company	NYSE: DE	Agricultural, construction, forestry, outdoor power and turf maintenance equipment. OEM diesel and natural gas engine manufacturer.	10.06%
Bunzl	LSE: BNZL	Distribution and Outsourcing	6%
Carpetright	Private	Retail	3%
Diageo	LSE: DGE; NYSE: DEO	Beverages	1.56%
AutoNation	NYSE: AN	Car dealership	14%
Microsoft	Nasdaq: MSFT	Software and Hardware conglomerate	3.6%
Beyond Meat	Nasdaq: BYND	Food	
Ritz-Carlton in San Francisco	Private	Hospitality	
TerraPower	Private	Nuclear power	
Transformco	Private	Retail and real estate	Debt interest
Vroom	Nasdaq: VRM	Car dealership	
StorageMart	Private	Self-storage	
Signature Aviation	Private	Aviation Services	
