= Sing! Sing! Sing! =

Studio album by John Pizzarelli
- Released: 1987
- Recorded: November 1986
- Studio: Lobel Studios, West New York, New Jersey
- Genre: Jazz
- Length: 31:00
- Label: Stash; P-Vine
- Producer: Bernard Brightman

John Pizzarelli chronology
Hit That Jive, Jack! (1985)	Sing! Sing! Sing! (1987)	My Blue Heaven (1990)

Sing! Sing! Sing! is an album by jazz guitarist John Pizzarelli that was released in 1987.

== Track listing ==
No.	Title	Writer(s)	Length
1.	"Zing! Went the Strings of My Heart"	James F. Hanley	2:43
2.	"I Guess I'll Have to Change My Plan"	Howard Dietz, Arthur Schwartz	2:27
3.	"I Still Think About You"	Pizzarelli	3:29
4.	"Knock Me a Kiss"	Mike Jackson	2:03
5.	"Couldn't You Read My Mind?"	Amanda Homi, Pizzarelli	4:14
6.	"Sing, Sing, Sing"	Louis Prima	3:28
7.	"I Was Too Lonely (And You Were a Little Too Late)"	Pizzarelli	2:21
8.	"I Hadn't Anyone Till You"	Ray Noble	3:04
9.	"The Late, Late Show"	Roy Alfred, Murray Berlin	2:08
10.	"The Trouble with Me Is You"	Pizzarelli	2:23
11.	"Better Luck Next Time"	Irving Berlin	2:40

== Personnel ==
- John Pizzarelli – guitar, vocals
- Eddie Daniels – tenor saxophone, clarinet
- Ken Levinsky – piano, synthesizer
- Bucky Pizzarelli – guitar
- Gary Haase – double bass
- Steve Ferrera – drums
- Amanda Homi – vocals
