= Edison Properties =

Edison Properties LLC
- Company type: Private
- Industry: Real estate development
- Founded: 1956; 70 years ago
- Founder: Jerry Gottesman (1930-2017)
- Headquarters: Newark, New Jersey, United States
- Owner: Gottesman family
- Website: edisonproperties.com

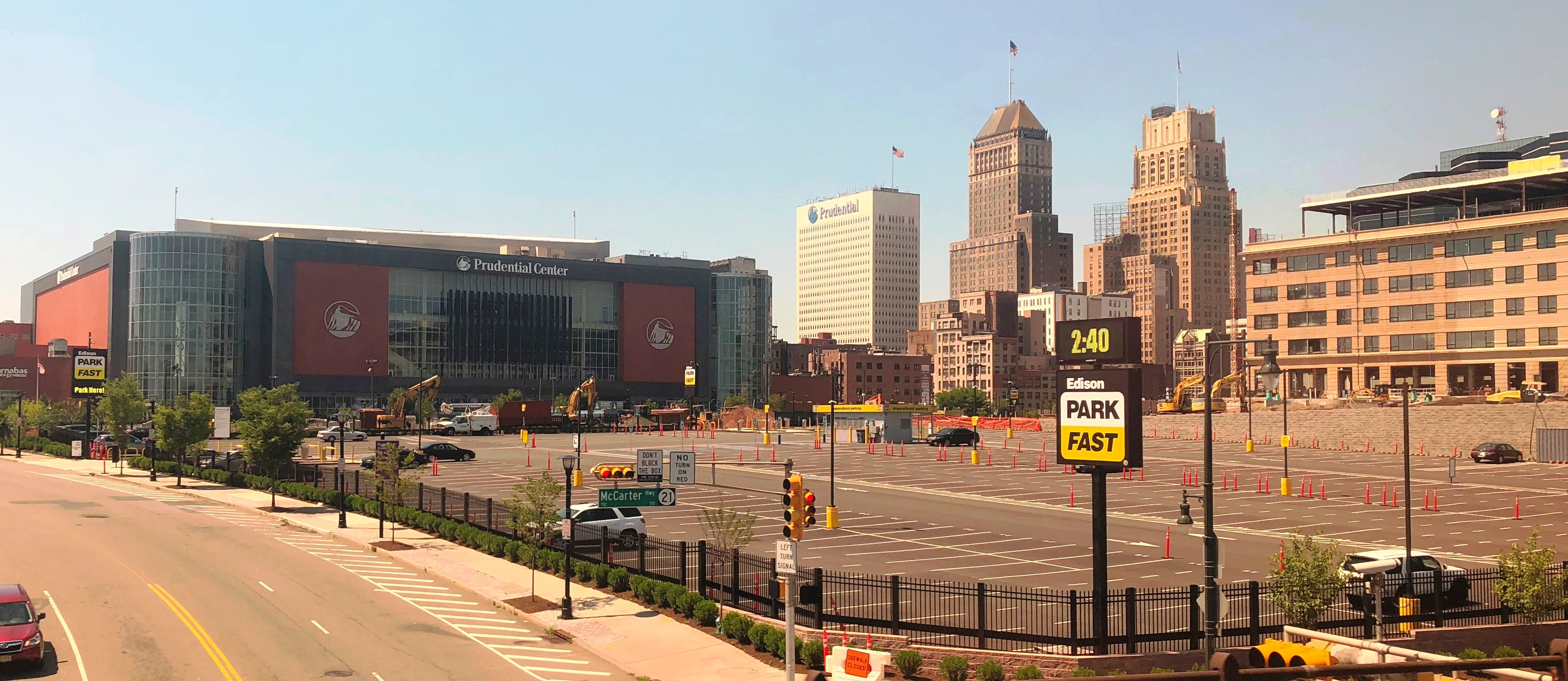
Site of Mulberry Commons in 2018, once an Edison ParkFast

Edison Properties is a privately owned real estate holding and development firm based in Newark, New Jersey. It owns Edison ParkFast, which owns 10,000 parking spaces in the New York City metropolitan area, many of which are slated for redevelopment; Ironside Newark, its headquarters location; 1120 Avenue of the Americas (Hippodrone NYC), which includes the ElevatedNY coworking space; and The Ludlow, a 23-story residential development at 188 Ludlow Street.

== History ==
The company was founded in 1956 by Jerry Gottesman (1930-2017).

Gottesman acquired "an old wooden factory building" on Edison Place, near Newark Penn Station, with the intent on relocating his sewing factory. Instead, he demolished the building and turned it into a parking lot. He then acquired parking lots in the Theater District, Manhattan and was an innovator at marketing to theatergoers.

In the late 1950's, Edison was chosen to manage the parking facility for Prudential Financial, which gained the company recognition.

In 1978, Edison acquired Hippodrome NYC, a 21-story office building and parking garage at 1120 Avenue of the Americas between 43rd and 44th Streets in Midtown Manhattan built on the site of the former New York Hippodrome in 1951-52. Edison acquired the building with the goal of increasing its parking revenue. A $55 million renovation of the building was completed in 2006.

In 2007, the company completed construction of The Ludlow, at 188 Ludlow Street between Houston and Stanton Streets on the Lower East Side. It contains 243 residential apartments spanning 23 stories.

In 2015, the company sold a parcel at 518 West 18th Street to HFZ Capital Group for $870 million. It had acquired the parcel in the 1980s.

In October 2015, the company acquired 620 12th Avenue in Hell's Kitchen, Manhattan for $55 million. It was leased to Verizon in 2022.

In September 2017, founder Jerry Gottesman died. At that time, the company had 600 employees.

In 2018, the company completed the conversion of Ironside Newark, a circa-1907 warehouse in downtown Newark, New Jersey, into more than 456,000 square feet of retail, commercial, and office space. It is part of Mulberry Commons.

In 2021, it sold Manhattan Mini Storage and WorkSpace Offices to StorageMart for $3 billion. At that time, it had 3.1 million square feet of storage space in 18 properties.

In the summer of 2025, the company partnered with Minskoff to redevelop a parking lot at 375 Lafayette St.

In December 2025, LAZ Parking was awarded a contract to manage the Edison ParkFast facilities.

In January 2026, the company sold a parking lot in Downtown Brooklyn for redevelopment into a 164,000-square-foot housing development.

In February 2026, Tishman Speyer was awarded a contract to manage Hippodrome NYC.
