= Michael Larson (businessman) =

American businessman and investor (born 1959)

- Born: October 1959 (age 66); Sacramento, California, US
- Education: Claremont McKenna College (BA); University of Chicago (MBA)

Michael Larson (born October 1959) is an American businessman and investor. He is the founder and chief investment officer of Cascade Investment, where he oversees all investment related activities of the Bill & Melinda Gates Foundation and Bill Gates' personal fortune. He assumed the role in 1994.

== Early life and education ==
Larson was born in Sacramento, California, in October 1959. He was raised in Albuquerque, New Mexico, and spent his summers in North Dakota. Larson attended Valley High School in Albuquerque.

He graduated from high school in two years and was recruited to West Point, the Coast Guard Academy, and the Merchant Marine Academy. He was also accepted at the University of Washington and Claremont McKenna College. Larson was only 16 when he graduated high school and could not attend the Coast Guard Academy until he was 18. He decided to attend Claremont McKenna and graduated in three years with a degree in economics. Larson subsequently earned an MBA from the University of Chicago Booth School of Business at the age of 21.

== Career ==
After receiving his MBA from the University of Chicago, Larson went to work for ARCO doing mergers and acquisitions. After a few years, Larson moved to Boston to work for Putnam Investments managing bond funds. After two years, Larson left Putnam to run his own fund.

=== Cascade Investment ===
While trying to buy a Chicago-based money management firm, Larson received a call from a head hunter to work for Bill Gates. The head hunter had heard of Larson from a few investors in Tacoma, Washington. In 1994, Larson and his wife moved to Seattle. Larson called the investment shop Cascade Investment because the generic name would allow him to operate in the market without drawing attention. Larson has and continues to operate under the radar with the exception of a rare interview with Fortune in 1999. When Larson started at Cascade, informally known as BGI (Bill Gates Investments), he was the only employee. In 1996, he later hired Alan Heuberger, a fellow graduate of Claremont McKenna College.

Larson originally managed $11.5 billion of the Gates fortune and foundation but that has swelled tremendously over the years as Gates sells his Microsoft stock. Although an actual statement isn't released, it's believed that Larson manages well over $80 billion year to date. This number includes the Bill & Melinda Gates Foundation and Gates's personal wealth. Cascade is a diversified investment shop, although there is an emphasis on real estate private equity managed by the subsidiary, Los Arboles Management.

Larson was a student of Professor Jerry St. Dennis while at Claremont McKenna College. Larson convinced St. Dennis to come out of retirement in order to act as an advisor to Larson. Before teaching at Claremont McKenna College, St. Dennis was Assistant Secretary to the Treasury under Ronald Reagan and was Chairman and CEO of California Federal Bank.

=== Other ventures ===
Larson regularly attends the Allen & Company Sun Valley Conference. He is Chairman of the Board of Directors at Western Asset and has been a member of the Board of Directors at Teledesic, Pan American Silver, Ecolab, Hamilton Lane, FoodTrader.com, Republic Services and AutoNation. Larson has served on the Board of Trustees at Claremont McKenna College, Lakeside School and the United Negro College Fund. He has served as the Chair of the Investment Committee at the University of Washington.
