= Johannes Leonardo =

American advertising agency

- Industry: Advertising, Marketing
- Founded: 2007
- Headquarters: New York, New York, Manhattan, New York, United States
- Area served: World Wide
- Key people: Jan Jacobs, founder and co-chief creative officer, Leo Premutico, founder and co-chief creative officer, Ferdinando Verderi, founder and partner
- Website: johannesleonardo.com

Johannes Leonardo is an advertising agency based in New York City founded in November 2007. The firm is 25 percent owned by WPP plc.

The firm's creative philosophy is inspired by the phrase “the consumer is the medium”, originally coined by the founders when they started the agency.

== History ==
Johannes Leonardo was founded in 2007 by Jan Jacobs and Leo Premutico, former Executive Creative Directors at Saatchi & Saatchi and Ferdinando Verderi.

The firm quadrupled its revenue between 2007 and 2010 growing from 4 to 50 employees. In 2011, the firm expected revenue to be up 120% from 2010 and was honored as the "creme de la creme" across the WPP network for its work with WNYC Radio.

In 2014, the firm moved its headquarters to new offices in SoHo, Manhattan.

From 2015 to 2016, Johannes Leonardo saw a 40% increase in revenue and 27% increase in headcount.

In 2016, the firm hired former Droga5 Global Business Director Bryan Yasko as president.

Since 2016, the agency more than doubled in size to 104 people and saw revenue soar 82 percent from $14 million in 2016 to $26 million.

== Notable campaigns and clients ==
In 2010, Johannes Leonardo's Google “Demo Slam” campaign invited consumers to create their own Google tech demonstrations to showcase Google's latest product innovations and received nearly one billion impressions.

In 2012, the firm collaborated again with Google for its "Project Re:Brief" campaign, reconceptualizing classic ads from Volvo, Alka-Seltzer, Avis, and Coca-Cola. The campaign was awarded the inaugural Mobile Grand Prix in 2012.

In 2017, the “Original is Never Finished” campaign for Adidas Originals, led by a 90-second spot reimagining the Frank Sinatra song “My Way” and featuring Snoop Dogg, Petra Collins, Dev Hynes, Kareem Abdul-Jabbar and others was awarded the top prize at the Cannes Lions Festival in the Entertainment for Music category. The agency's work for adidas Originals garnered over 30 awards in 2017 across Cannes, D&AD and The One Show.

Johannes Leonardo's other clients include The Coca-Cola Company, Vroom.com, Massachusetts Mutual Life Insurance Company, Amazon Fire TV, New York City FC, Alexander Wang (designer), and Bleacher Report.

== Awards and recognition ==
In 2011, Johannes Leonardo was featured as the “Agency to Watch” in both AdAge's and Creativity's Agency A-Lists.

In 2011, Johannes Leonardo won AdAge Small Agency of the Year, Silver.

In 2016, the firm was recognized on Ad Age's 2016 A-List Agencies to Watch.

In 2018, Johannes Leonardo was named the No. 4 agency on AdAge's Agency A-List, a ranking of the nation's top 10 advertising agencies.

Johannes Leonardo has been awarded 14 Cannes Lions since 2007, including the inaugural Cannes Mobile Grand Prix for Google's Project Re: Brief and, in 2017, the Grand Prix in the Entertainment for Music category for “Original is Never Finished” for adidas Originals.
