= John H. Dobbs =

American businessman

John Hull Dobbs Jr is an American businessman who is the former president of Dobbs Equity Partners LLC of Memphis, Tennessee. He is the son of John Hull Dobbs Sr, and grandson of James K. Dobbs, who owned car dealerships and restaurant and airline catering businesses.

== Early life ==
Dobbs graduated from the private Memphis University School in 1985. He earned a bachelor's degree from Duke University, and an MBA from the University of North Carolina Kenan-Flagler Business School.

== Career ==
In 1998, the Dobbs Automotive Group was the third-largest car dealer in the US when it sold its 22 dealerships to AutoNation for $200 million in stock.

== Philanthropy ==
John and Katherine Dobbs are philanthropists known for funding educational initiatives. In 2012, The Children's Museum of Memphis named their campus "The John and Katherine Dobbs Family Center" following a donation from the couple. Further contributions to exhibits at the museum include the H2Oh! Splash Park, a water park designed to promote problem solving and language development.

Katherine and John also funded the educational farm at Hutchison School for Girls. The farm augments academic studies on topics such as the human impact on animal habitats and deforestation.

== Personal life ==
Dobbs has always lived in Memphis, is married to Katherine Stobbs from Atlanta, and as of 2011 they had two children. They have donated to the Hutchison School, and they have two daughters enrolled there.

On January 5, 2021, Dobbs flew some of his friends from Memphis to Washington, DC, on his eight-seat Bombardier Challenger 300 private jet, allegedly in connection with a Stop the Steal rally. The passengers were Dobbs, George Zanone III, Carter Campbell Sr., Vince Smith and his wife, Kaki Valerius Smith, brothers Dan and Bob McEwan, and an unidentified man.
