= Mitchell Jackson =

Mitchell Jackson or variant, may refer to:

- Mitchell Jackson (1816–1900), diarist and second owner of the Mitchell Jackson Farmhouse
- E. Belle Mitchell Jackson (1848–1942; surnamed Mitchell Jackson), American abolitionist and educator
- Mitchell S. Jackson, American writer

== See also ==
- Juanita Jackson Mitchell (1913-1992; surnamed Jackson Mitchell), American lawyer
- Michael Jackson (disambiguation)
- Mitchell (disambiguation)
- Jackson (disambiguation)
