= Michael Manley (CEO) =

British businessman and former CEO of FCA (born 1964)

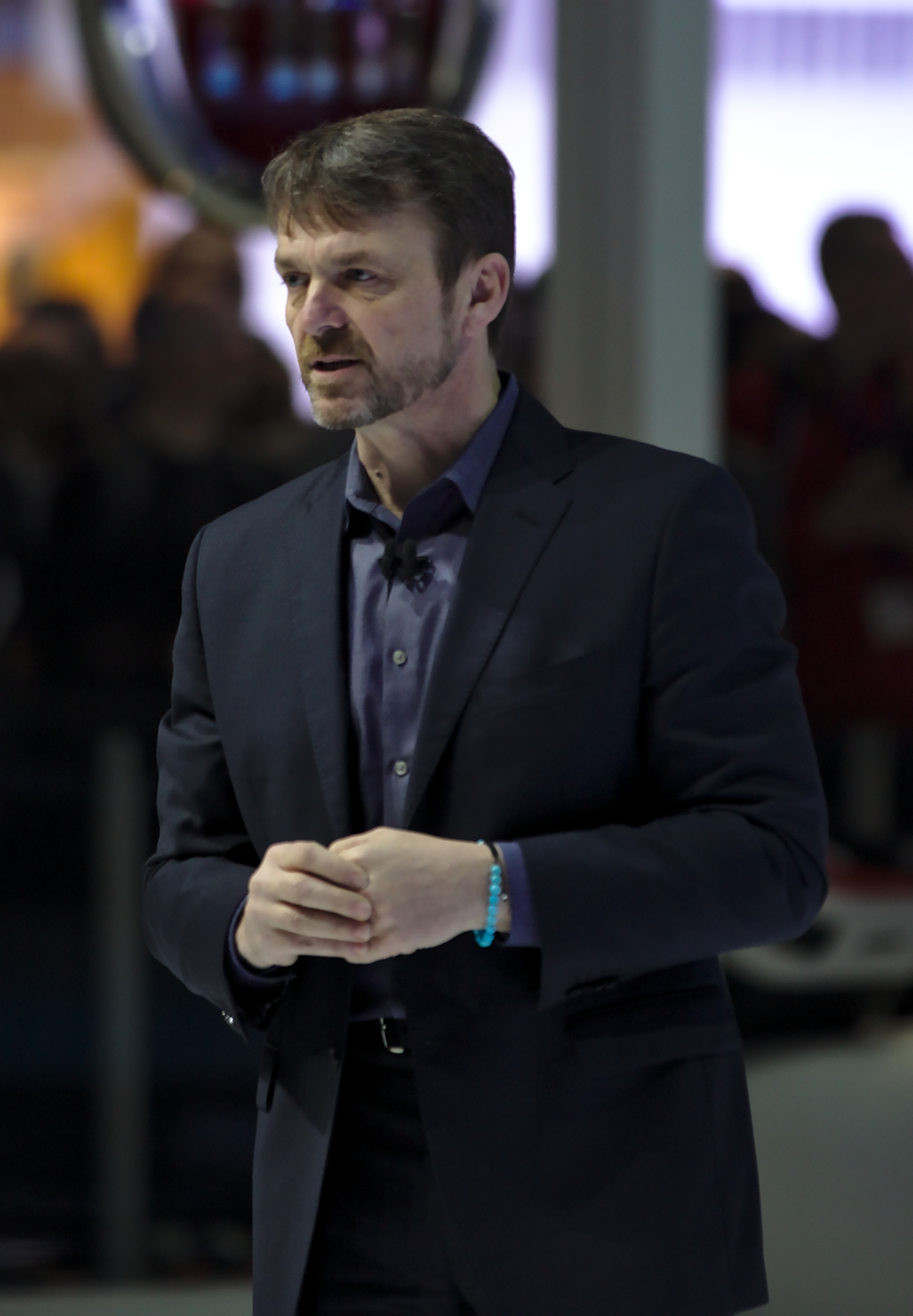
- Manley in 2019 with Fiat Chrysler Automobiles.
- Born: 6 March 1964 (age 62); Edenbridge, Kent, England, UK
- Education: London South Bank University (BSc); Ashridge Management College (MBA)
- Occupation: CEO AutoNation

Michael Manley, often known as Mike Manley (born 6 March 1964) is an English businessman and current CEO of American automotive retailer AutoNation. He previously served as managing director of the North American operations of Stellantis. In 2018 Manley was appointed as CEO of Fiat Chrysler Automobiles (FCA), following the announcement that previous CEO Sergio Marchionne would step down for health reasons.

== Career ==
Manley was educated as an engineer and started his career as a trainee at car financing company Swan National. He continued his career by working at Renault and Peugeot dealerships, before moving on to Lex Autosales car dealerships. In 2000, Lex Autosales was bought by DaimlerChrysler UK, and Manley was appointed director of Network Development for DaimlerChrysler UK. He was transferred to the United States in 2003. In 2008, Manley became Executive Vice-President of planning and sales for Chrysler followed by COO for the Asia region and then in 2009, he became the CEO of the Jeep division, a position which he held with FCA since the merger with Fiat, with the addition of becoming responsible for RAM.

On 21 July 2018 Manley was appointed CEO of FCA, as Sergio Marchionne stepped down for medical reasons.

In December 2020 it was announced that Manley will lead the North American operations of Stellantis, once the FCA-PSA merger is finalized. He left Stellantis in September 2021 and starting November 2021 Manley began to serve as CEO of AutoNation of Ft. Lauderdale, Florida. He also joined the board of the Stellantis Foundation, which manages the charity activities of Stellantis.

== Awards and honours ==
- Automotive Hall of Fame Distinguished Service Citation 2016
- Auto Express Hall of Fame 2016
- 2016 Detroit Free Press Automotive Difference Maker Award
