= Manhattan Mini Storage =

Self storage company in New York City, United States

- Company type: Subsidiary
- Industry: Self storage
- Founded: March 1987; 39 years ago in New York City, United States
- Founders: Jerry Gottesman
- Number of locations: 51 (January 2026)
- Area served: New York City
- Services: Self storage
- Parent: StorageMart
- Website: www.manhattanministorage.com

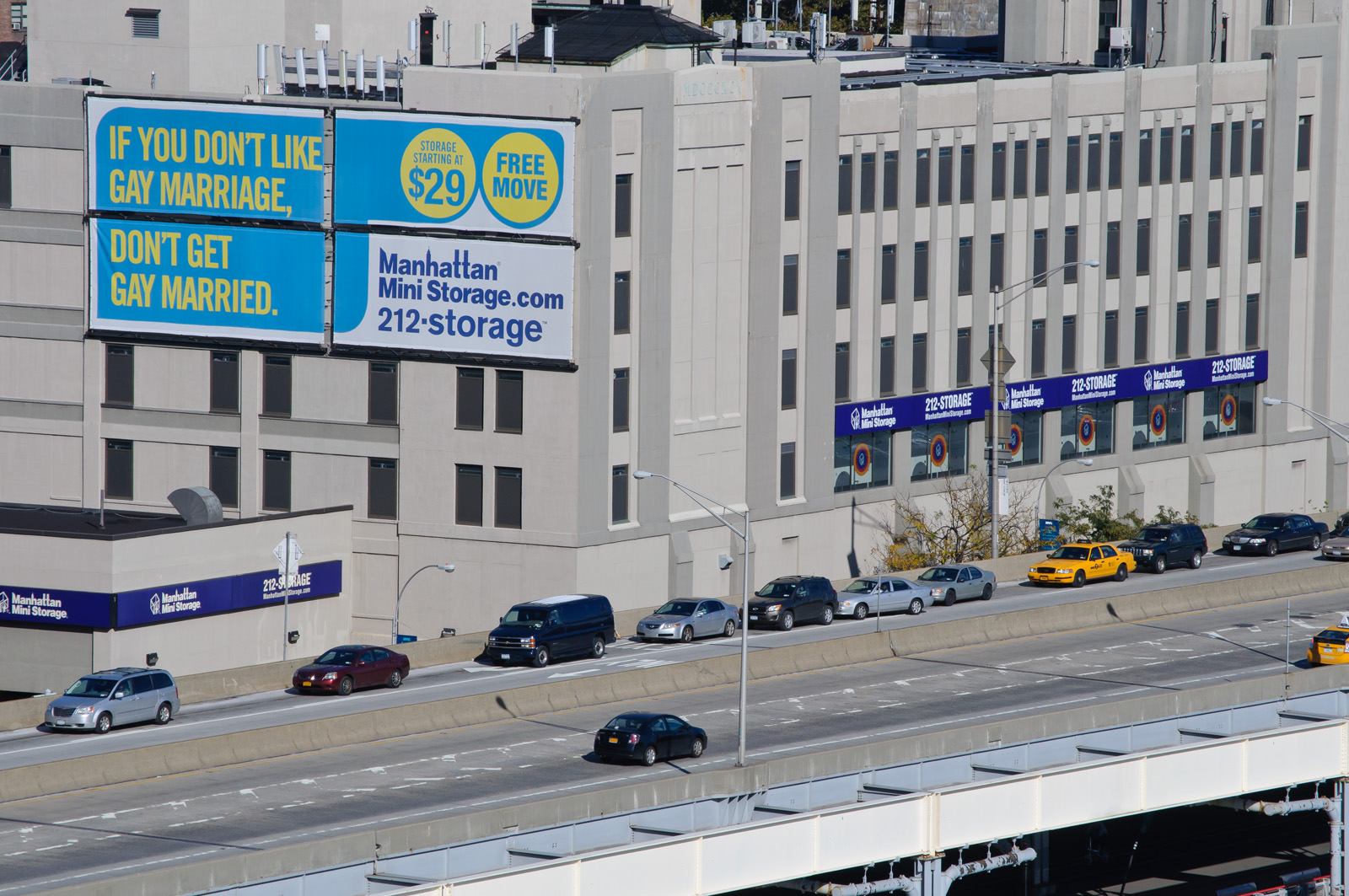
The Manhattan Mini Storage location at 220 South Street in Two Bridges, Manhattan, which featured a billboard in support of same-sex marriage in 2011.

Manhattan Mini Storage, a division of StorageMart, is a Manhattan-based self storage company operating in New York City. As of January 2026, it had 51 locations.

== History ==
The company was founded in 1978 by Jerry Gottesman (1930-2017), who had founded Edison Properties.

In December 2021, the company was acquired by StorageMart for $3 billion. At that time, the company had 3.1 million square feet of storage space in 18 properties.

In January 2026, the company acquired a portfolio of 15 locations containing 1.3 million net rentable square feet in 25,498 storage units from affiliates of The Carlyle Group for $1.03 billion.

== Advertising campaigns ==
The company has run billboard advertisements that have been described as "playful and provocative".

Taglines have included:

- "Your closet's scarier than Bush's agenda" (2007)
- "Your closet space is shrinking as fast as her right to choose" (2007)
- "Your closet's so narrow it makes Cheney look liberal" (2007)
- "Your closet's so shallow it makes Paris Hilton look deep" (2007) - included a picture of chihuahua wearing pearls and the words , attracted a cease and desist letter from Hilton's lawyer
- "Michele Bachmann says God told her to run for President. How come God never talks to smart people anymore?" (2011)
- "Remember if you leave the city, you'll have to live in America" (2011)
- "Why leave a city that has six professional sports teams, and also the Mets?" (2011)
- "If you don't like gay marriage, don't get gay married" (2011) (released prior to the passage of the Marriage Equality Act in New York State).
- "Don't trust the cloud" (2014)
- "I Like My Wife and Kids, But I Love My Storage Locker" (2015) which featured "a transgender woman, or male drag queen, [posing] by a vanity with furs and wigs surrounding"
- "Safe, secure, protected, with minimal charges just like Prince Andrew" (2022) - in relation to Andrew Mountbatten-Windsor's connections with Jeffrey Epstein.
- "Store old things here, not the White House" (August 2024, ahead of the 2024 United States presidential election)
