= Mike Jackson (Australian entertainer) =

Australian entertainer (born 1946)

Mike Jackson OAM
- Born: 23 November 1946 (age 79); Fishtoft, Lincolnshire, England
- Origin: Melbourne, Australia
- Occupations: Children's entertainer, recording artist, songwriter, radio show host
- Instruments: Anglo concertina; Autoharp; Bandoneon; Bodhran; Bones; Hammered Dulcimer; Harmonica; Hurdy-gurdy; Jaw Harp; Kazoo; Melodeon; Mountain Dulcimer; Ocarina; Spoons; Ukulele; Vocals
- Years active: 1971–present
- Website: mikejackson.com.au

Mike Jackson is an Australian children's entertainer, recording artist, songwriter, radio show host, and author. He is perhaps best known for his version of Bananas in Pyjamas and appearances on ABC Television.

== History ==
=== Early years ===
Melbourne-based Jackson (born in Fishtoft, near Boston, Lincolnshire, UK) immigrated to Australia in 1970 as an assisted migrant with wife, Lynn on board the P & O ship, SS Himalaya.

The pair settled in the Sydney suburb of Mosman and there, at the Elizabeth Hotel Folk Club in the centre of town they rediscovered the folk music Jackson had grown up with through his grandfather's singing and playing.

Having taught himself harmonica in high school and acquired a taste for comic songs from his grandfather and the radio, he branched out onto other instruments and acquired a reputation for being able to get a tune out of almost anything.

=== 1972 ===
In 1972 the pair moved from Sydney to Canberra with Jackson's work as a salesman and their interest in folk music grew as he began regularly playing at sessions and singing and playing at folk clubs. This was the same year Jackson performed his first professional gig at The Dan O'Connell Hotel in Melbourne suburb of Carlton.

=== 1973 ===
Jackson began hosting and presenting the radio programme The Lark in the Morning on Canberra public radio station 2XX FM, a programme which continues to run to this day. During this time he founded Pageant.

=== 1974 ===
1974 was the year Jackson cemented his status as a recording artist and regular radio show host. He performed his first solo performance at a National Folk Festival, performed as a backing musician on the Larrikin Records album Man of the Earth, and Pageant released an eponymous album of unaccompanied harmony songs.

=== 1975 ===
Jackson founded The Higgins Municipal Bush Band, which consisted of three of Pageant's members. Often, concert, dances and festivals would feature both solo performances by the band members plus items by the two bands.

=== 1976 ===
Pageant gave its last performance at that the 1976 National Folk Festival. Using the advice from mentor Alex Hood, an Art's Council grant to tour 13 regional schools and a full diary of bookings, Jackson resigned his position as Area Sales Manager and became a full-time professional musician/entertainer.

=== 1979 ===
In 1979, Jackson met Michelle Freeman on stage at the Kapunda Celtic Music Festival and they soon married.

=== 1980s ===
In 1980, while looking for Australian songs for their first album for kids, Jackson wrote his first song: "The Bondi Tram". It was written on a paper tray mat at 2am in a cold motel room in the Sydney suburb of Miranda. During the same year and inspired by British album The Funny Family, Mike and Michelle Jackson recorded their first children's album Bunyips, Bunnies and Brumbies, an album which went Gold.

They toured Australia, New Zealand, Canada and the US almost non-stop for seven years. During this time, they featured in a national TV Show (Playmates on ABC Television), created three songbooks, co-wrote an instruction book for string figure novices and recorded ten albums, with their second, Playmates going Platinum and the rest of their first four kids' disks going 'Gold' in Australia. They had two North American releases, Bunyips, Bunnies and Brumbies and Playmates, which were released in Canada on Sharon, Lois and Bram's Elephant Records label, distributed by A&M Records. In 1986 the pair went their separate ways.

=== 2013 ===
Received 2013 National Folk Festival, Lifetime Achievement Award.

Festival Director, Sebastian Flynn read out this preamble before presenting the award to Jackson: "The most recently established award is the National Folk Festival Lifetime Achievement Award. It is awarded to an artist of long-standing for his or her lifetime contribution to enriching the culture of folk music and arts in Australia, together with an ongoing contribution to the National Folk Festival. The inaugural recipient in 2013 is a worthy awardee on both of these counts and has also been a unique example in nurturing the talents and enthusiasm for folk music in young people over many years. He has travelled the length and breadth of Australia as well as being a wonderful ambassador for Australian folk music during his extensive travels overseas. He is said to have played 'live' to more children than the Wiggles and is a generous performer who connects with people of all ages and walks of life."

=== 2015 Australia Day Honours ===
Presented with Medal of the Order of Australia (OAM) in the general division.

The citation read: "Mr Mike Jackson. For service to the performing arts as a musician, composer and entertainer."

== Groups/Bands including Jackson ==
=== Colonial Experience ===
In early 1973, Jackson joined the Monaro Folk Music Society's Bush Dance Band Colonial Experience. At that time, there was increased interest in traditional folk dance in Australia so the band played regularly at Woolshed dances and weddings. They never recorded but were among the bands invited to test the acoustics of the Concert Hall in the Sydney Opera House before it was officially opened.

=== Pageant ===
Jackson founded the 6-piece a cappella group Pageant in Canberra, Australia late in 1973, with their first performance taking place at the Wagga Wagga Folk Festival. Originally formed to sing Christmas carols, Pageant rapidly expanded to singing songs gathered from, and inspired by, English bands like Steeleye Span, The Watersons, The Copper Family and others. Pageant recorded one self-titled album (Pageant) in 1975 and played numerous festivals before disbanding after their last performance at the 1976 Australian National Folk Festival.

=== The Higgins Municipal Bush Band ===
Jackson's next band, The Higgins Municipal Bush Band, performed on National Television within twenty minutes of their first meeting. As part of the publicity for the 1975 Australian National Folk Festival, the members of the band had arrived separately at the TV studios to dance for another band which failed to show. So, they hastily grabbed their instruments, invented a name and performed as if they were a long established band. Once formed, the band performed together almost weekly for several years despite living in towns spread across 1000 km (Gosford, NSW; Canberra, ACT; Steiglitz, VIC).

== Duos featuring Jackson ==
- Mike and Michelle Jackson
- Mike Jackson with Peter Hayes
- Mike Jackson with Ian Blake
- Mike Jackson with Rowan Hammond
- Mike Jackson with Diane Hill
- Mike Jackson with Thom Jackson

== Instruments ==
Jackson plays the following instruments: anglo concertina, autoharp, bandoneon, bodhran, bones, hammered dulcimer, harmonica, hurdy-gurdy, jaw harp, kazoo, melodeon, mountain dulcimer, ocarina, spoons, ukulele.

== Other performance skills ==
String games, juggling, storytelling, poetry.

== Discography ==
=== Albums ===
- Man of the Earth (backing vocals and various instruments)
- Pageant
- Revived and Relieved (various instruments)
- No Man's Land (backing vocals and various instruments)
- Patchwork
- Bunyips, Bunnies and Brumbies (Gold Disk)
- Playmates (Platinum Disk)
- The Roaring Days
- Ain't it Great to be Crazy (Gold Disk)
- Dances for Little Kids Vol.1 (Gold Disk)
- Car Tunes
- Riding Along
- Who Built the Ark?
- Sleepytime Songs
- Afloat in a Boat
- Rufty Tufty
- Concert for Little Kids
- Mulga Bill's Bicycle
- The Animals Noah Forgot
- Toy Box Bop
- Dances for Little Kids Vol.2
- Waltzing Matilda
- The Loaded Dog
- The Man from Snowy River
- The Old Bark School
- Bedtime Songs
- I'm a Nut!!
- Dr Knickerbocker
- Uke'n Play Ukulele
- Singing in the Night Time
- Uke'n Play Ukulele for Kids
- Uke'n Play Country Ukulele
- Uke'n Play Ukulele Supa Easy Ukulele
- Uke'n Play Ukulele Omnibus Edition
- Uke'n Play Christmas Ukulele
- Uke'n Play Ukulele for Teachers
- Mike Jackson's Best Ever Kids' Songs (Book plus two CDs)
- Come on and Move Your Body
- Oopsy Daisy

== Bibliography ==
=== Books and Book and CD Kits ===
- Playmates Songbook
- Ain't it Great to be Crazy Songbook
- Bananas in Pyjamas Songbook
- Musical Instruments to Make and Play
- Rig-a-Jig-Jig Vol.1
- Rig-a-Jig-Jig Vol 2
- String Games for Beginners
- Bush Dance
- 101 Children's Songs for Buskers
- Fipple Fun 1 (Christmas Songs for Recorder)
- Fipple Fun 2 (Australian Songs for Recorder)
- Campfire Songbook
- Social Dance
- Uke'n Play Ukulele
- Essential Aussie Kid's Songs
- Uke'n Play Ukulele for Kids
- Uke'n Play Ukulele Country Ukulele
- Uke'n Play Ukulele Supa Easy Ukulele
- Uke'n Play Ukulele Omnibus Edition
- Uke'n Play Christmas Ukulele
- Uke'n Play Ukulele for Teachers
- Mike Jackson's Best Ever Kids' Songbook

== Filmography ==
=== Film ===
- Crackers (1998) – Music only

=== Television ===
ABC TV

- Playmates
- Mr. Squiggle
- Alexander Bunyip's Billabong

Channel 9

- Moby Dick (1998) – Billed as Michael Jackson
- Red Faces ("Hey Hey Its Saturday" segment)
- Over Ann's Rainbow

=== Video ===
- ABC for Kids Video Recordings: Mike Jackson's Concert for Little Kids

== Awards and nominations ==
=== ARIA Music Awards ===
Year	Nominated works	Award	Result
1993	Rufty Tufty	Best Children's Album	Nominated
