= Signature Aviation =

British aviation services company

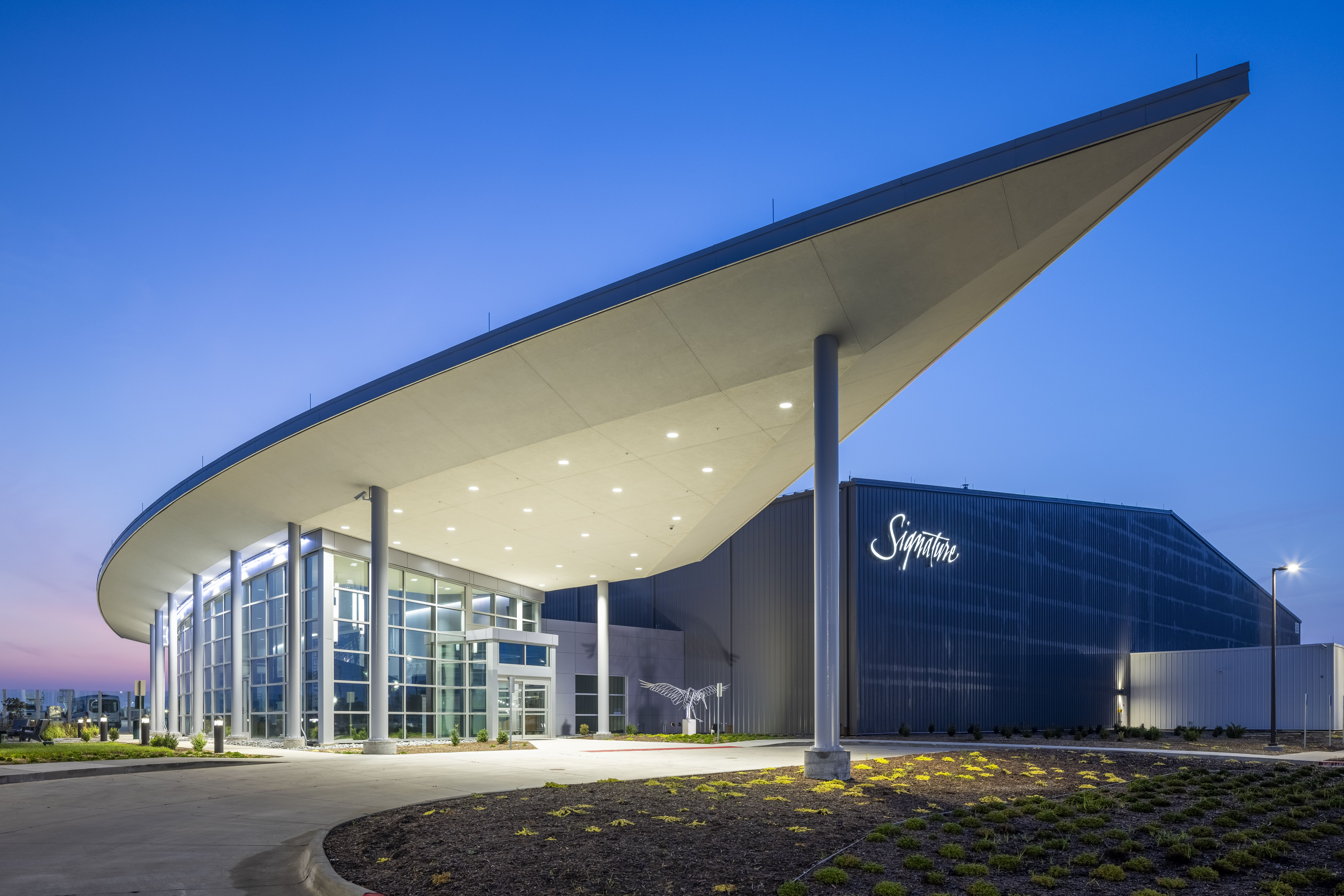
- A Signature Aviation private terminal
- Formerly: BBA Aviation
- Industry: Aviation
- Founded: W. Wilson Cobbett Ltd; 1879; 147 years ago Scandinavia Belting; 1911; 115 years ago British Belting & Asbestos; 1925; 101 years ago BBA Group; 1967; 59 years ago BBA Aviation; 2007; 19 years ago Signature Aviation; 2019; 7 years ago
- Headquarters: Orlando, Florida
- Key people: Tony Lefebvre (CEO)
- Services: Private Aviation Terminals
- Revenue: ▼US$1,413.9 million (2020)
- Operating income: ▼US$192.8 million (2020)
- Net income: ▼US$(19.0) million (2020)
- Number of employees: 8,000 (2021)
- Website: www.signatureaviation.com

Signature Aviation is a multinational aviation services company headquartered in Orlando, Florida. The company was founded as W. Wilson Cobbett Ltd in 1879 and subsequently specialised in the manufacture of industrial supplies, particularly in the automotive and aviation sectors. During World War II, the company produced materials for British military aircraft, such as the Supermarine Spitfire, Hawker Hurricane, and Hawker Typhoon. During the 1980s and 1990s, the firm decided to increasingly orientate itself towards the aviation industry via a string of acquisitions and divestitures. It was listed on the London Stock Exchange until it was acquired by Cascade Investment, Blackstone Group, and private equity firm Global Infrastructure Partners in May 2021.

== History ==
=== Early years ===
Signature Aviation originates to W. Wilson Cobbett Ltd, an industrial belting works originally based in Scotland. Its early name came from its two founders, Sir William Fenton and Walter Cobbett, who established the company during 1879 to manufacture textile belts for use on industrial machinery. For its first thirty years, the production and sale of these belts comprised the company's main commercial activity; over time, Wilson Cobbett expanded into numerous specialist industrial niches and developed a global presence.

During 1911, as an indication of its international expansion, the company was renamed Scandinavia Belting; it continued to be rebranded throughout the twentieth century, becoming British Belting & Asbestos in 1925. During the interwar period, it manufactured numerous products for the automotive industry; the company was a supplier of the Ford Motor Company on its Model T vehicle as well as to other manufacturers, including Jaguar Cars. British Belting & Asbestos was also active in the aviation sector. During the Second World War, the company produced materials used on several British military aircraft, including the Supermarine Spitfire, Hawker Hurricane, and Hawker Typhoon. During 1967, the company opted to rebrand itself under the name BBA Group. During this period, it was largely focused upon the production of automotive materials. By the early 1980s, BBA Group was the world's largest supplier of brake pads within the automotive industry.

In 1986, BBA Group made its first major approach into the aviation sector via its acquisition of APPH, a British business that specialised in aircraft undercarriages and hydraulics; shortly thereafter, it also bought a similar business based in North America. During 1992, the company was involved in the creation of Signature Flight Support through the merger of Page Avjet, an executive aircraft interiors business, and Butler fixed base operations. In 1996, BBA Group took full ownership of Signature Flight Support. By this point, the company was structured into two major divisions: Aviation and Materials Technologies.

During 1996, BBA Group purchased Trinity Aerospace Engineering; in 1998, the company moved into jet engine repair and overhaul through the acquisitions of H+S Aviation from Vector Industries, and UNC Airwork Corp, formerly a unit of American conglomerate General Electric. By 1998, Signature Flight Support had expanded to possess the world's largest chain of fixed base operators (FBOs), operating a total of 41 facilities across the globe.

=== Twenty-first century ===
During 2000, BBA Group conducted a major divestment, selling off its Mintex brake pad division in exchange for £389m. Around this time, the company also diversified into the flight training sector, purchasing Oxford Aviation, then the largest professional pilot training organisation in Europe, for £55.4 million. During the following year, BBA Group bought American business Aircraft Service International Group ('ASIG'), the acquisition of which reportedly doubled the firm's presence in the commercial ground handling market, for $25m. During 2002, the group's chief executive Roy McGlone stated that management's strategy at that point was to focus on its FBO ventures and to dispose of non-core businesses. As a sign of the company's changes, BBA Group was reclassified on the London Stock Exchange from the engineering sector to the transport sector.

During 2006, BBA Group opted to demerge its materials technology division, which developed and manufactured nonwoven materials used in the hygiene and medical markets and in numerous industrial applications, and friction materials for train brakes: the demerged business was named Fiberweb plc. That same year, Ontic, a legacy aerospace components supplier, was acquired; Oxford Aviation was sold during the following year. BBA Group's name was changed to BBA Aviation in 2007 to mark its transformation to a focused aviation group.

In 2008, BBA Aviation bought the assets of Hawker Beechcraft Services Inc's Line Service Operations in exchange for £65.4 million. During 2011, it bought GE Aviation's fuel measurement business for £38.3m and a new services base at Bozeman in Montana, United States, for $10.5m. In 2012, BBA Aviation purchased Dryden Air Services and PLH Aviation in Canada, securing a presence in the Canadian market. During 2013, it acquired Maguire Aviation Group for $69 million. That same year, BBA Aviation reportedly withdrew from talks with Dubai Aerospace Enterprise over acquiring aircraft maintenance provider StandardAero. In 2014, BBA Aviation sold APPH (comprising UK sites and their US Wichita site) for $128 million to Héroux-Devtek Inc.

In 2015, BBA Aviation significantly increased the reach of the Signature Flight Support network through the acquisition of Landmark Aviation from The Carlyle Group for $2.1 billion; aviation periodical Flight International described the deal as being "the largest acquisition in the history of the business aviation services industry". During 2017, its ASIG subsidiary was sold off for $202 million. Early that same year, BBA Aviation and Gama Aviation agreed to merge their charter and management operations together, reportedly forming the largest aircraft management business in the United States as a result. In 2018, BBA Aviation acquired fuel specialist EPIC Aviation; that same year, it also bought Firstmark Corp, a provider of proprietary components and subsystems, which was incorporated into the Ontic portfolio.

During late 2019, BBA Group decided to sell Ontic to CVC Capital Partners in exchange for $1.365 billion; the firm also announced a special dividend to shareholders totalling $835 million from the proceeds of the sale. To reflect its change in business focus, the company's board also elected to rename the group Signature Aviation to better align the firm with its most significant brand in its core market.

In February 2021, Bill Gates–owned Cascade Investment, Blackstone Group, and private equity firm Global Infrastructure Partners made a $4.7 billion offer to acquire Signature Aviation. As a result of the acquisition, Cascade's stake increased from 19% to 30%.

In August 2022, the company acquired the TAC Air division of The Arnold Companies. It was announced that fourteen TAC Air locations would be rebranded as Signature Aviation as part of the deal.

== Operations ==
The company is headquartered in Orlando, Florida, and has significant operations across the US as well as Canada, Europe, Asia, South America and Africa.

With the increased pace of US Immigration and Customs Enforcement (ICE) flights carrying detainees and deportees in the second administration of Donald Trump, activists and protesters have targeted Signature facilities in locations including Seattle, Hanscom, MA and Minneapolis servicing ICE flights. Internal ICE documents dating from 2019 linked Signature to detainee flights departing from over a dozen more US airports.

A company spokesperson verified that Signature is required under federal law to provide services to all U.S. government-operated or chartered flights, and that it cannot restrict flight operations that comply with applicable laws and regulations.
