= Vroom, Inc. =

American retailing company

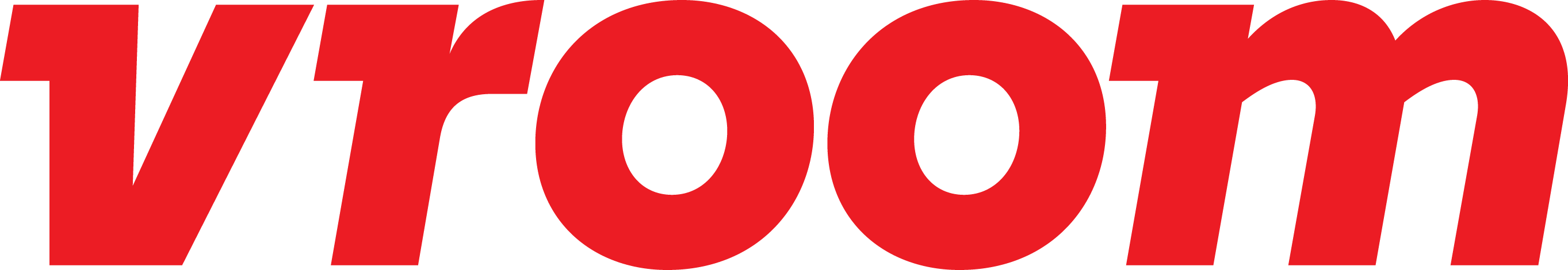
- Type: Public
- Traded as: Nasdaq: VRM
- Industry: Auto Finance/Automotive AI Analytics
- Founded: August 2013; 13 years ago
- Headquarters: Houston, Texas, US
- Key people: Thomas Shortt (CEO)
- Products: Used cars
- Revenue: ▲US$2.6 billion (2021)
- Website: vroom.com

Vroom, Inc. is a parent company of United Auto Credit Corporation (UACC) and CarStory. Previously, Vroom was a used car retailer and e-commerce company that let consumers buy, sell, and finance cars online. Vroom ceased e-commerce automotive sales operations on January 22, 2024.

== History ==
The company was founded in August 2013 by Kevin Westfall and Marshall Chesrown as AutoAmerica. In November 2014, Elie Wurtman and Allon Bloch joined as co-founders to transform the company into a technological platform and the company was renamed Vroom. It also has a refurbishment facility in Stafford, Texas and was included on Forbes’ list of the Hottest E-Commerce Startups of 2015. Vroom's current CEO is Tom Shortt. He succeeded Paul Hennessy, who was previously the CEO of Priceline.com.

In December 2015, the company acquired Texas Direct Auto, a Stafford-based company founded in 2002 that is now owned by Vroom but operated as a separate brand. The combined company was profitable and reached $900 million in revenue in 2015. In February 2018, Vroom closed operations in its Whitestown, Indiana, facility and laid off approximately 25% of its staff in the New York City and Stafford, Texas locations. In December 2018, Vroom closed a Series G financing round of $146 million led by AutoNation and began scaling its operations again.

On January 22, 2024, Vroom announced "that it is discontinuing its e-commerce operations and winding down its used vehicle dealership business in order to preserve liquidity and enable the Company to maximize stakeholder value through its remaining businesses." Vroom owns and operates United Auto Credit Corporation (UACC), a leading automotive finance company, and CarStory, a leader in AI-powered analytics and digital services for automotive retail. UACC and CarStory will continue to serve their third-party customers and focus on growing those businesses".

In November 2024, Vroom filed for Chapter 11 bankruptcy protection with plans to convert debt into equity backed by its lenders. The company blamed a decline in sales following a pandemic boom. Vroom exited bankruptcy protection on January 15, 2025.

== Products ==
Rather than functioning as a peer-to-peer marketplace, Vroom was an e-commerce service that handled the entire transaction with no-haggle pricing. The company offered financing from more than 12 banks and delivered cars to customers nationwide. All cars that Vroom sold were reconditioned, and the company used proprietary RFID tracking and prioritization software to automate the refurbishment process. Vroom provided a seven-day money-back guarantee on purchases and a 90-day bumper-to-bumper warranty. Vroom also bought cars from customers, who could receive a cash voucher after submitting photos and information about the car online.

== Funding ==
Vroom raised $440 million in total funding. Investors include AutoNation, L Catterton, General Catalyst Partners, Allen & Company, T. Rowe Price, John Elway, Steven Gerrard (former CEO of Blockbuster and AutoNation), Cascade Investments (the investment holding company of Microsoft founder Bill Gates), Jeffery Boyd (chairman of The Priceline Group), Bob Mylod (former CFO of The Priceline Group), PICO Venture Partners, Elie Wurtman, Allon Bloch, and Dan Gilbert (Owner of Cleveland Cavaliers & Quicken Loans).

On January 22, 2024, Vroom announced that they were ultimately were unable to raise the necessary capital in the current market to fund their automotive retail operations. This lack of funding caused the company to shutter its automotive retail operations and lay off 800 employees.

== Regulatory and legal matters ==
=== Florida title transfer complaints ===
In January 2022, the Florida Department of Highway Safety and Motor Vehicles filed an administrative complaint accusing the company of failing to transfer vehicle titles to buyers within the 30-day period required under state law, citing 47 such instances. The company was given 21 days to respond and could either contest the allegations or settle by paying $23,500, calculated at $500 for each case. Contesting the complaint carried the risk of suspension or revocation of its dealer license. A department spokesperson said that missing or delayed title transfers were the most frequent subject of complaints it received.

A second complaint followed in early June 2022, in which the department identified 87 occasions on which the 30-day deadline had been missed, in some cases by several months. The company settled in July 2022 by agreeing to a fine of $87,000, assessed at $1,000 per instance. It attributed the delays to the expansion of its business.

Reporting by a Jacksonville television station in late 2022 found that 119 buyers had lodged title transfer complaints with Florida authorities since March 2021. Over the preceding three years the Better Business Bureau had logged 6,108 complaints against the company nationwide. In a 2021 filing with the U.S. Securities and Exchange Commission the company acknowledged operational difficulties that included a backlog in titling and registering vehicles, which it ascribed to shutdowns during the COVID-19 pandemic. Asked to comment, the company said it did not discuss pending litigation or arbitration but sought to resolve any difficulties its customers encountered.

=== Texas attorney general lawsuit ===
On 19 April 2022 the attorney general of Texas, Ken Paxton, filed a petition in the district court of Travis County, Texas, against Vroom Automotive LLC and Vroom Inc. under the Texas Deceptive Trade Practices–Consumer Protection Act. The state alleged that the company had misrepresented and failed to disclose substantial delays in transferring clear title and completing vehicle registration, had misrepresented the history and condition of the vehicles it sold, and had misrepresented the terms and approval status of financing. The petition sought injunctive relief, restitution and civil penalties. It stated that consumers had filed roughly 5,000 complaints with the Better Business Bureau and the attorney general's office over the preceding three years, about 4,000 of them in the previous twelve months.

According to the petition, the Texas Department of Motor Vehicles had issued five notices of department decision after investigations which concluded that the company had failed to register changes of ownership in time on 168 occasions and had offered or sold vehicles without holding a certificate of title on at least nine occasions. An investigation by a Dallas–Fort Worth television station reported more than 80 violations recorded by the department since 2019, resulting in 59 cease and desist orders.

In May 2022, Vroom Automotive LLC consented to a temporary injunction under which it undertook to maintain its practice of holding title to every vehicle it sold or advertised as available on its platform. A final settlement resolving all claims in the petition was reached in December 2023 without any admission of wrongdoing by either Vroom entity. Under its terms the company agreed to pay $2 million in civil penalties and $1 million in attorneys' fees, half due in September 2024 and the remainder in September 2025, and to be permanently bound by an injunction covering certain operational practices it had already adopted.

=== Federal Trade Commission action ===
On 2 July 2024, the Federal Trade Commission filed a complaint against Vroom, Inc. and Vroom Automotive, LLC in the United States District Court for the Southern District of Texas. The commission authorized the filing by a unanimous vote. The agency alleged that the company had misrepresented the thoroughness of the examinations its vehicles underwent before being listed, had failed to obtain buyers' agreement to shipping delays or to refund them promptly when delivery deadlines passed, and had not made the disclosures required of used vehicle dealers.

The complaint stated that the company had sold more than 170,000 vehicles through its website since 2019 and had advertised a 184-point inspection checklist. Buyers were reported to have received cars with worn brakes, bald tires and other defects. The agency further alleged breaches of the Mail, Internet, and Telephone Order Rule, under which a seller must ship within the period stated in its advertising or, where none is stated, within 30 days. The company's advertising promised delivery within 10 to 14 days, yet some buyers were said to have waited three months or longer without being offered the choice of accepting a new date or cancelling for a refund. The complaint also alleged that the Buyers Guide required by the Used Car Rule was supplied only late in the purchase process and often lacked required entries. Warranty terms, it stated, were not posted near the vehicles offered for sale as the Pre-Sale Availability Rule requires.

A stipulated order was entered by the court in July 2024. The defendants neither admitted nor denied the allegations except as to the court's jurisdiction. They accepted a $1 million monetary judgment for consumer redress. The order permanently enjoined the company from misrepresenting inspections or delivery times and required it to substantiate claims about shipping and to comply with the three rules at issue. Writing for the consumer financial services group at Ballard Spahr, Brian Turetsky observed that the case indicated the agency would continue scrutinizing motor vehicle retailing under its existing powers while the Combating Auto Retail Scams Rule remained stayed pending litigation.

On 13 March 2025, the commission announced that it was distributing more than $934,000 from the settlement fund to 20,361 buyers affected by the company's missed delivery commitments. Recipients were asked to cash their cheques within 90 days.

=== Securities litigation ===
From March 2021, shareholders filed several putative class actions against the company and several of its officers in the United States District Court for the Southern District of New York, alleging breaches of federal securities law. The suits – Zawatsky et al. v. Vroom, Inc. et al., Holbrook v. Vroom, Inc. et al. and Hudda v. Vroom, Inc. et al. – each advanced claims under sections 10(b) and 20(a) of the Securities Exchange Act of 1934 and SEC Rule 10b-5 on behalf of proposed classes of investors who had acquired the company's securities, the class period running from June 2020 to March 2021 in one case and from November 2020 to March 2021 in the other two. The court consolidated them in August 2021 as In re: Vroom, Inc. Securities Litigation and appointed a lead plaintiff. The consolidated amended complaint added claims under sections 11, 12 and 15 of the Securities Act of 1933 against the company, certain officers and directors, and the underwriters of its September 2020 secondary offering. The court granted the company's motion to dismiss all claims on 19 March 2025.

Shareholders also filed derivative suits on the company's behalf against officers and directors, four of them in the Southern District of New York between August 2021 and February 2022, consolidated as In re Vroom, Inc. Shareholder Derivative Litigation. Two further derivative suits were filed in the District of Delaware in April 2022 and April 2024. All were stayed pending the outcome of the consolidated securities action and were subsequently closed after the plaintiffs dismissed their claims voluntarily.
