= Cheryl Miller (executive) =

U.S. business executive

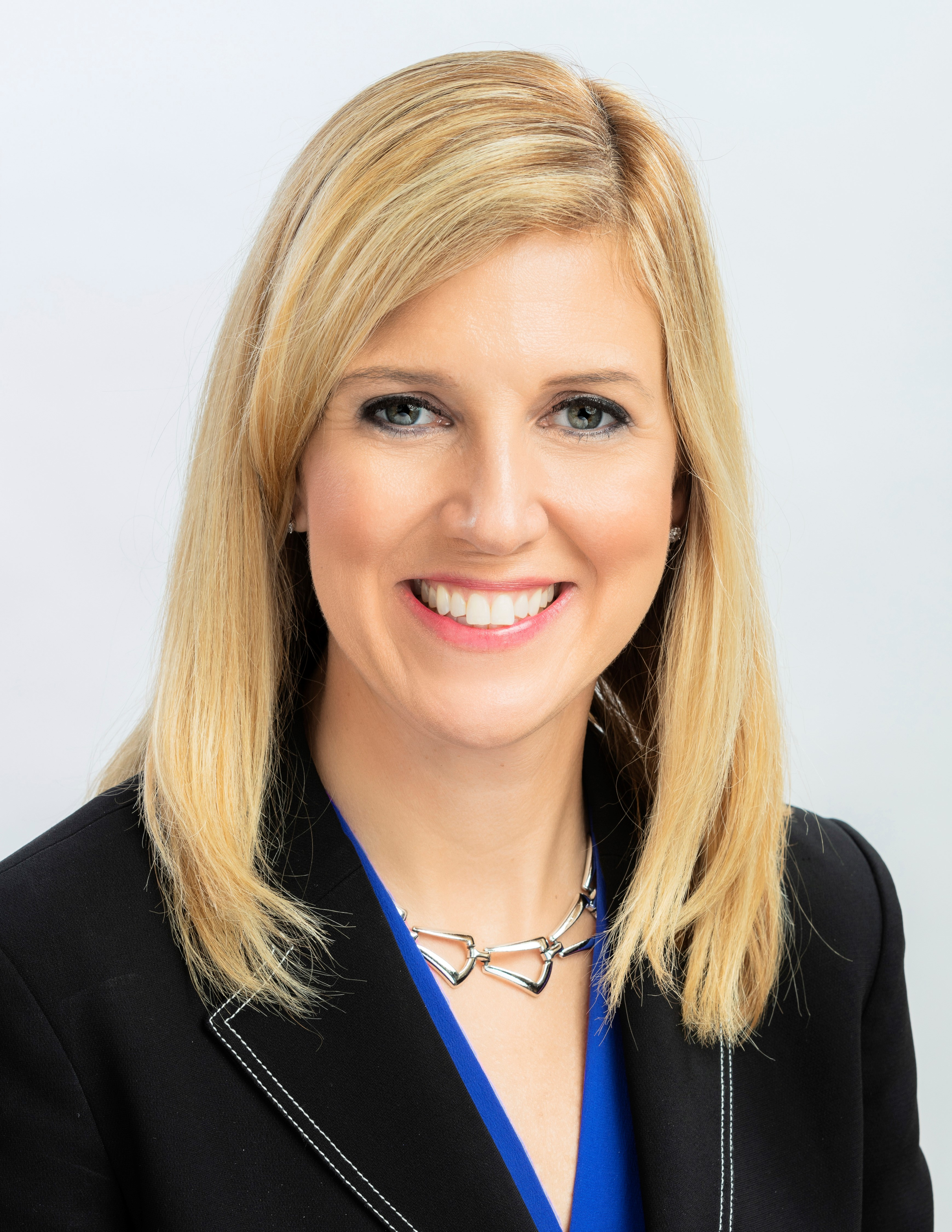
- Born: Puerto Rico
- Education: James Madison University
- Occupation: Business executive

Cheryl Miller is an American business executive. In 2019, she became the first female chief executive officer of a publicly traded auto retail company in the Fortune 500. Miller was the CEO of AutoNation from 2019 to 2020. She was one of 38 female CEOs of Fortune 500 companies.

== Early life and education ==
Cheryl Miller was born in Puerto Rico and raised in Baltimore. Her father worked for the U.S. Postal Service and her mother was a government worker. Miller graduated from James Madison University with a bachelor's degree in finance and business.

== Career ==
Miller started her automotive career with Circuit City. She worked in financing vehicles for an automotive company and later worked with the Alamo National car rental agency. In 1998, she moved to Florida to join a company which was the predecessor of AutoNation.

Miller joined AutoNation in 2009 and in 2014, she was promoted to chief financial officer. In 2017, she managed a partnership with the self-driving company Waymo. In July 2019, Miller became the chief executive officer of AutoNation. As the CEO of AutoNation she oversaw 26,000 employees and 325 auto dealerships across the United States.

Miller resigned her position as CEO for AutoNation due to undisclosed medical reasons in July 2020. She was still liable for bonuses and stock for the work she had done and in addition she received a leaving settlement of $5.4m. Under the terms she was not allowed to work in competition to the company for a year.
