= Children's Museum of Memphis =

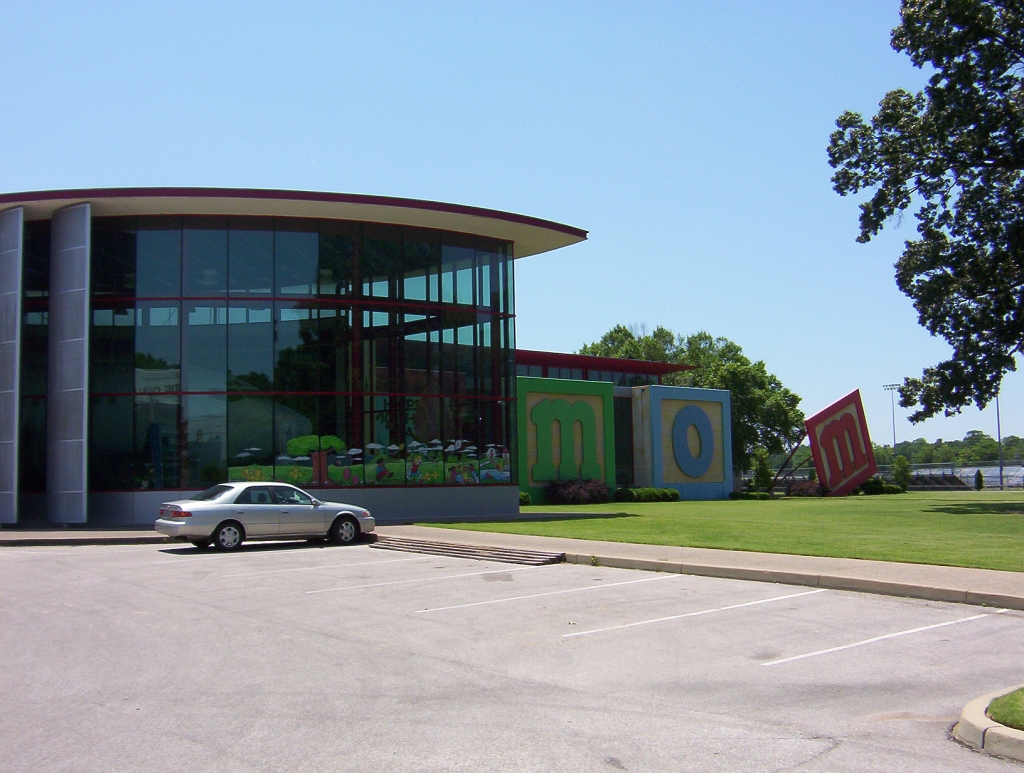
- Front entrance
- Established: 1990
- Location: 2525 Central Avenue, Memphis, Tennessee
- Coordinates: 35.12538°N 89.97596°W
- Type: Children's museum
- Public transit access: MATA
- Website: www.cmom.com

The Children's Museum of Memphis (CMOM) is located in Midtown Memphis at 2525 Central Avenue in Memphis, Tennessee, USA.

CMOM's mission is to create memorable learning experiences through the joy of play in hands-on exhibits and programs. The museum offers interactive exhibits and programs for children and their families. The museum houses over 20 hands-on exhibits.

The museum is open Tuesday - Sunday from 9 am to 5 pm. It is closed on Thanksgiving Day, Christmas Eve and Christmas Day.

== History ==
The Children's Museum of Memphis is located in the former National Guard Armory that was built from 1941 to 1942. The Children's Museum of Memphis Founders are Polly Glotzbach, Harriet McFadden, Mars Widdicombe, and Harry J. Phillips Sr.

In 2013, the museum opened an exhibit called H2Oh! Splash, a splash pad with a garden theme that was funded, in part, through a gift from the Katherine and John Dobbs family foundation.

== Timeline ==
- 1985 Children's Museum Planning Group formed.
- 1987 The Children's Museum of Memphis incorporated as a private, non-profit educational corporation.
- 1988 The museum signed a lease with the City of Memphis for the National Guard Armory complex.
- 1990 After raising $3 million for construction, opened to the public on June 16.
- 1991 Celebrated first birthday in June with a first-year attendance of over 200,000 visitors.
- 1993 Celebrated third birthday with cumulative attendance of over 500,000 visitors.
- 1995 Celebrated fifth birthday with cumulative attendance of over 750,000 visitors.
- 1997 Celebrated seventh birthday with cumulative attendance of over one million visitors.
- 1999 Began a $6 million capital campaign to expand the museum by 16,000 square feet (1,500 m^{2}) with four new exhibit galleries.
- 2001 Finished the $6 million capital campaign (raised $7.2 million) to expand the museum. Ground-breaking ceremony and construction began on March 23.
- 2002 Museum expansion completed and opened on August 3. Welcomed the museum's 1,500,000th visitor.
- 2005 Welcomed the museum's 2,000,000th visitor.
- 2008 Welcomed the museum's 2,500,000th visitor.
- 2009 Hootin' Andy's Safety Train Brain Station opens. Arlo Guthrie, folk singer, is the voice of Andy.
- 2012 Museum's campus was named the Katherine and John Dobbs Family Center.
- 2015 The museum leased the Memphis Grand Carousel from the City of Memphis and sent it off for restoration
- 2016 The museum built the Memphis Grand Carousel Pavilion and Ballroom to house the carousel once it returns from restoration
- 2017 The Memphis Grand Carousel was shipped back to Memphis where it was installed in the new facility. It is open to the public for daily rides.

== Gallery ==
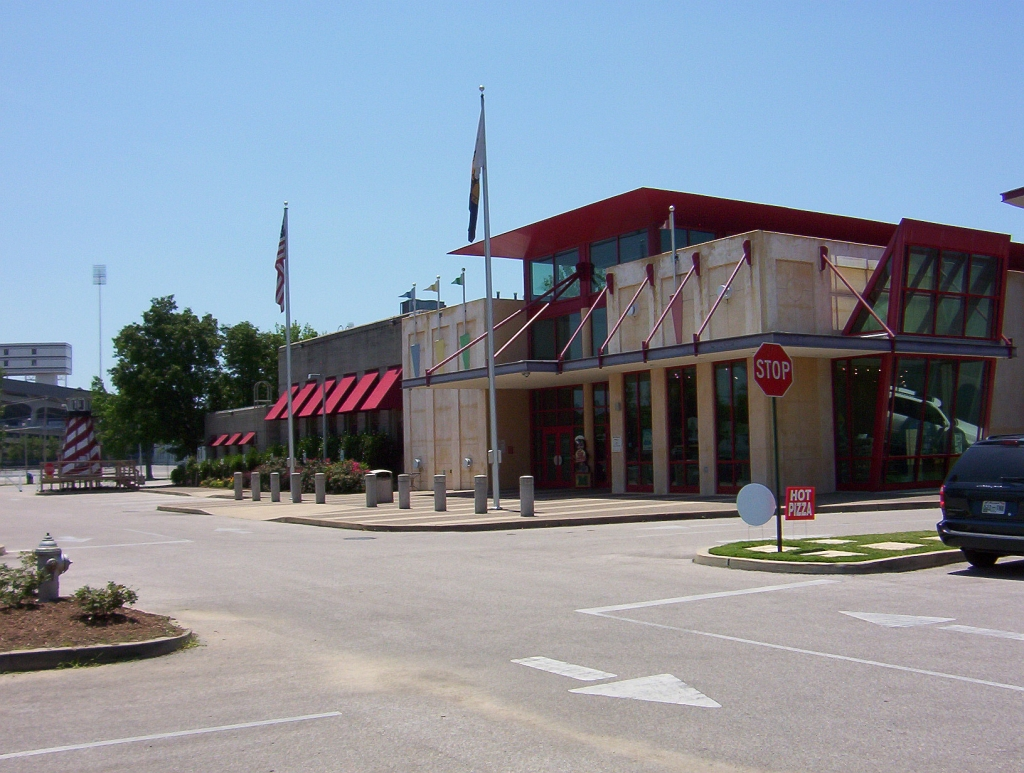

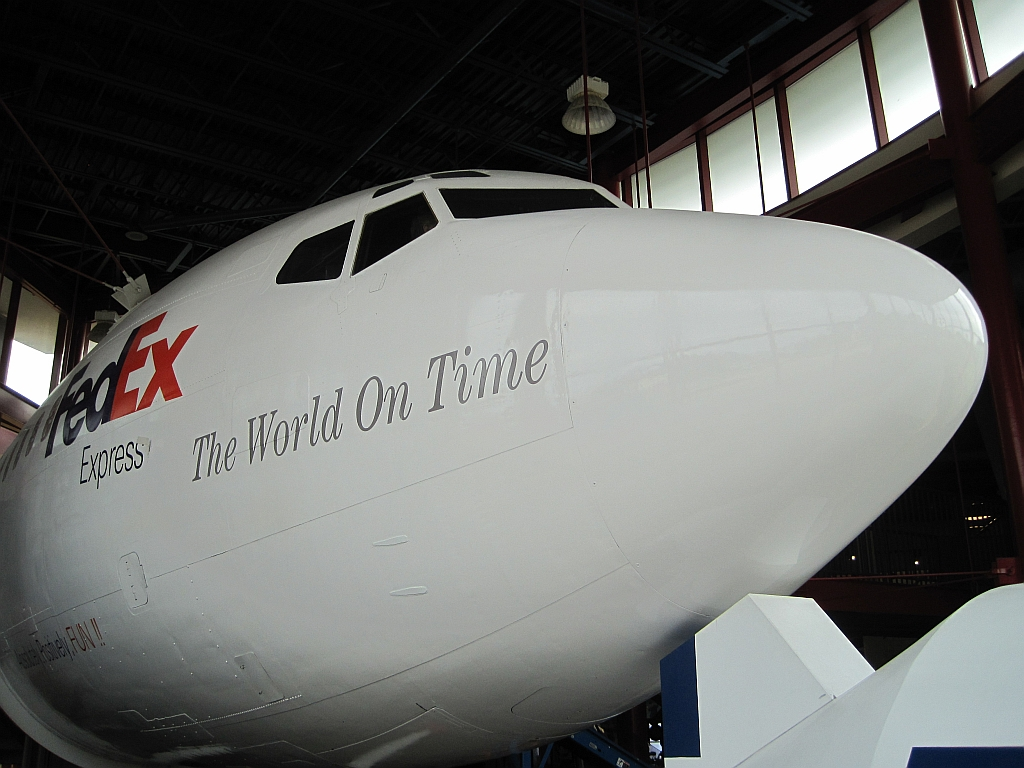

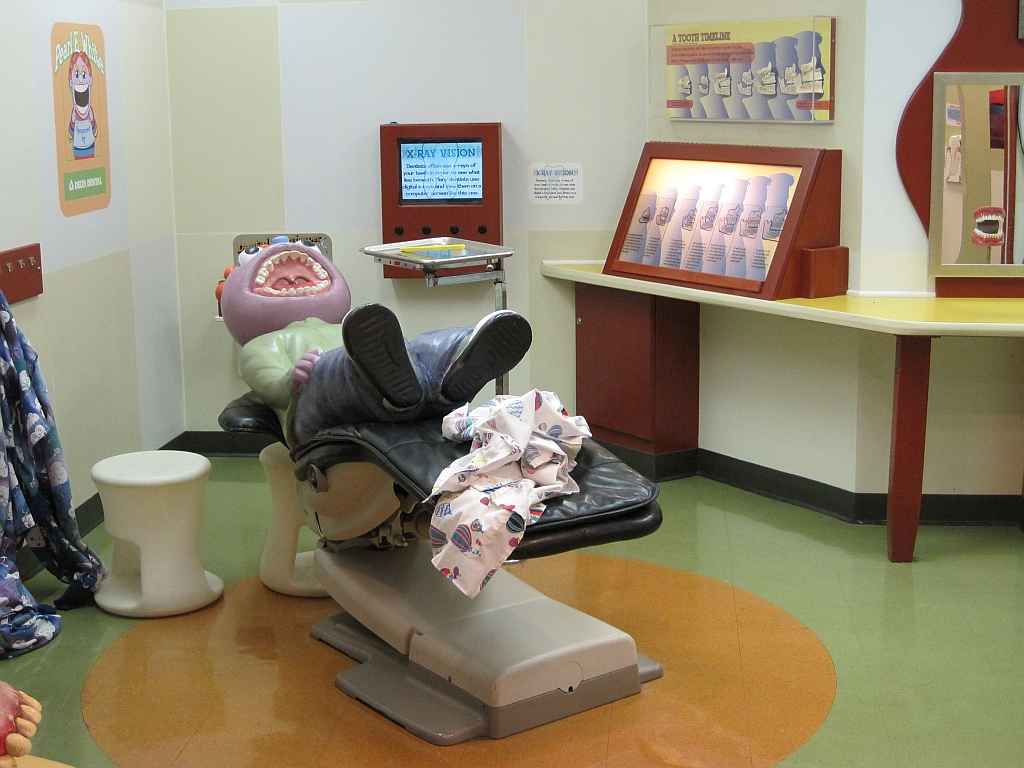

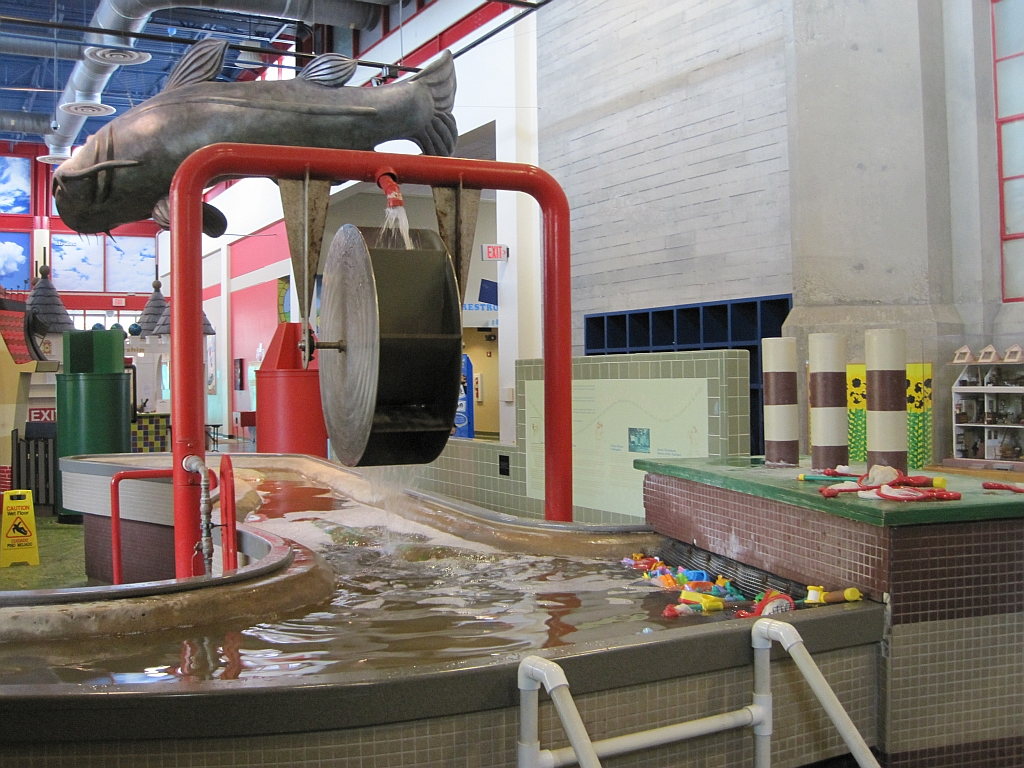

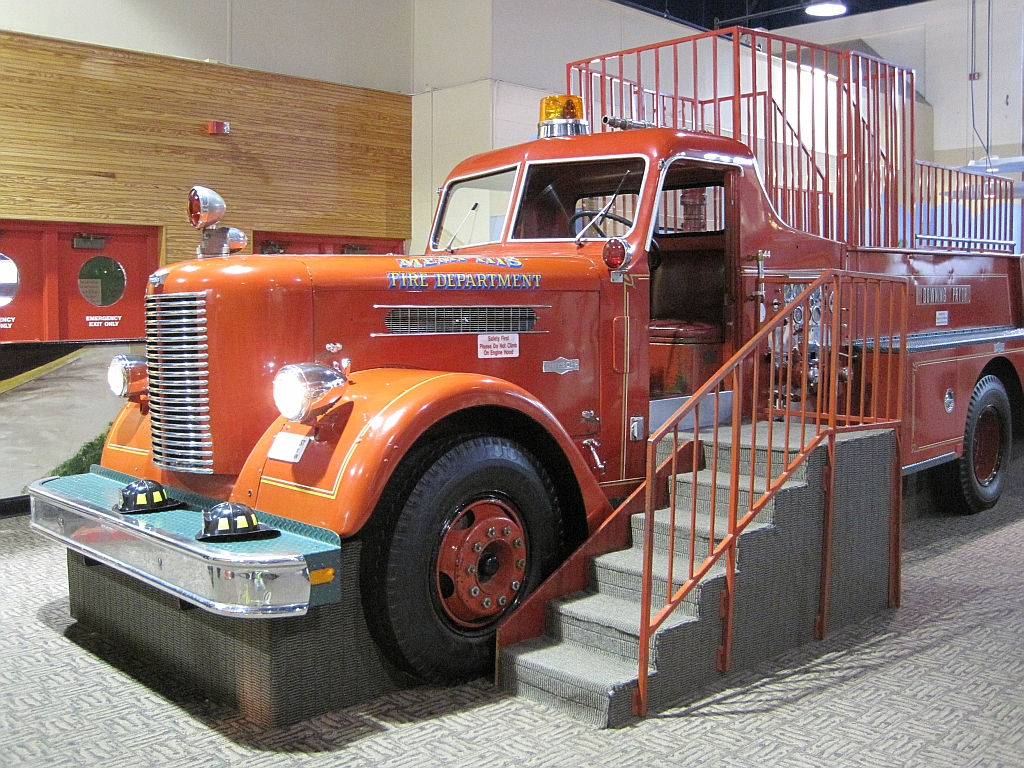

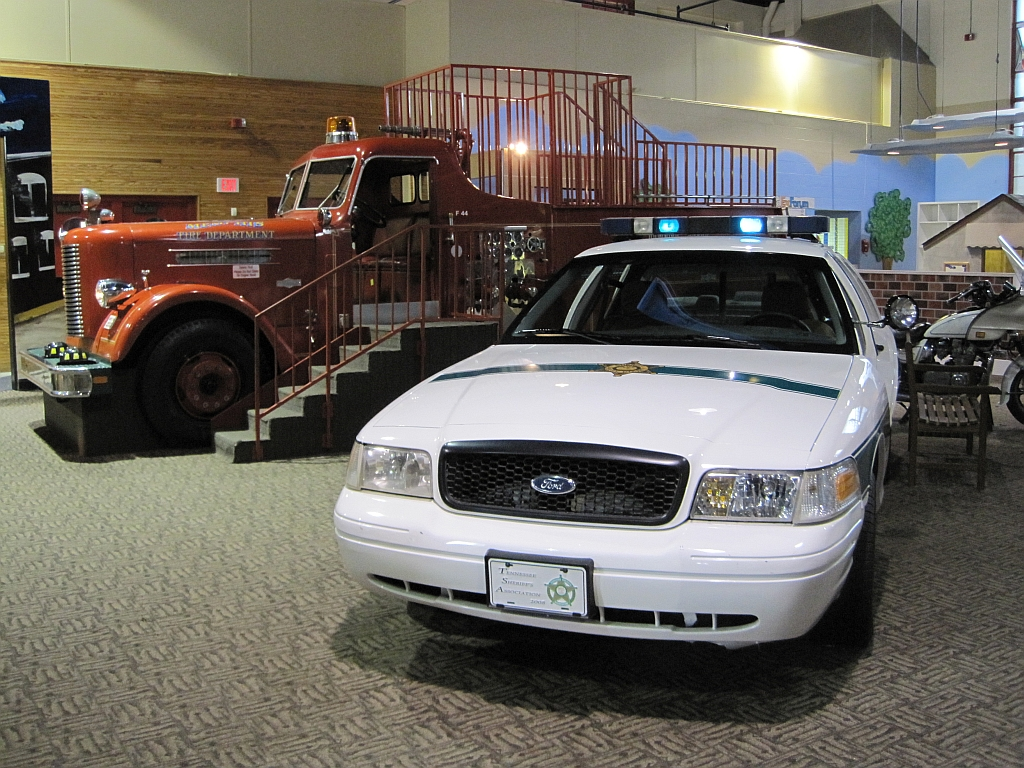

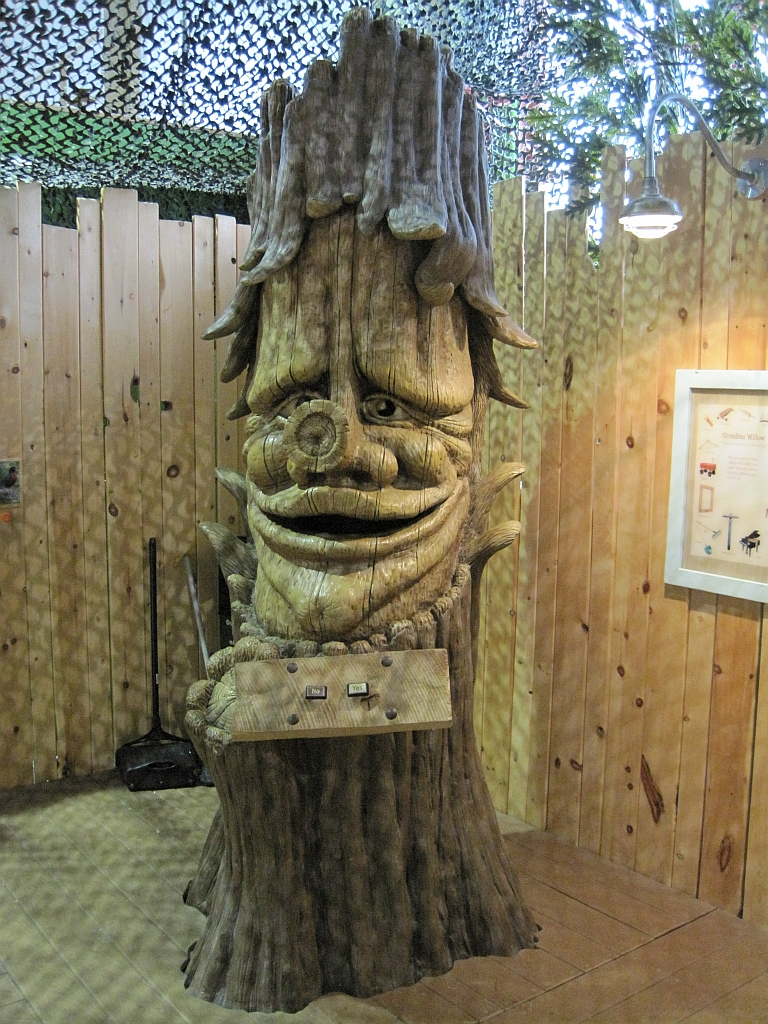

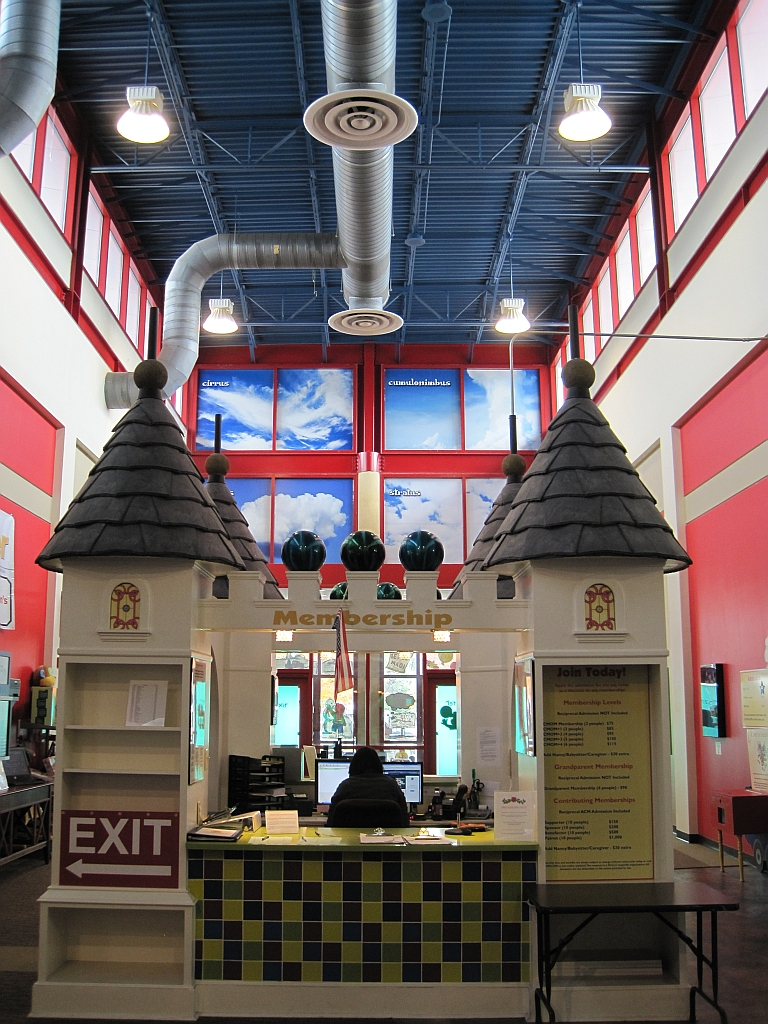

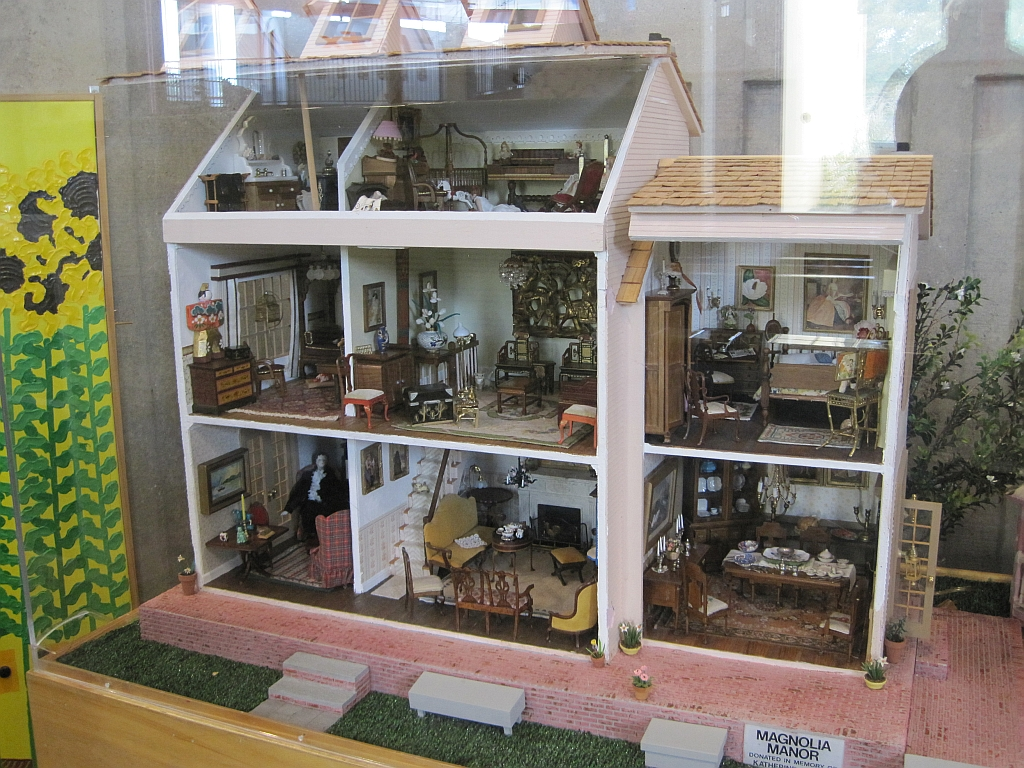

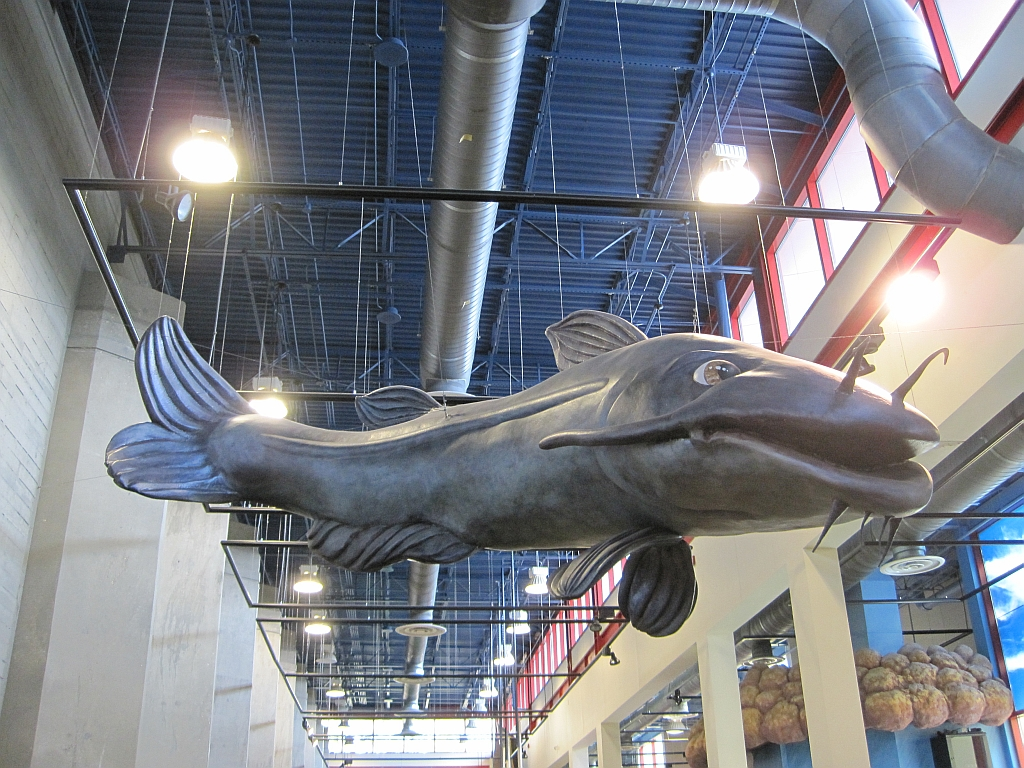

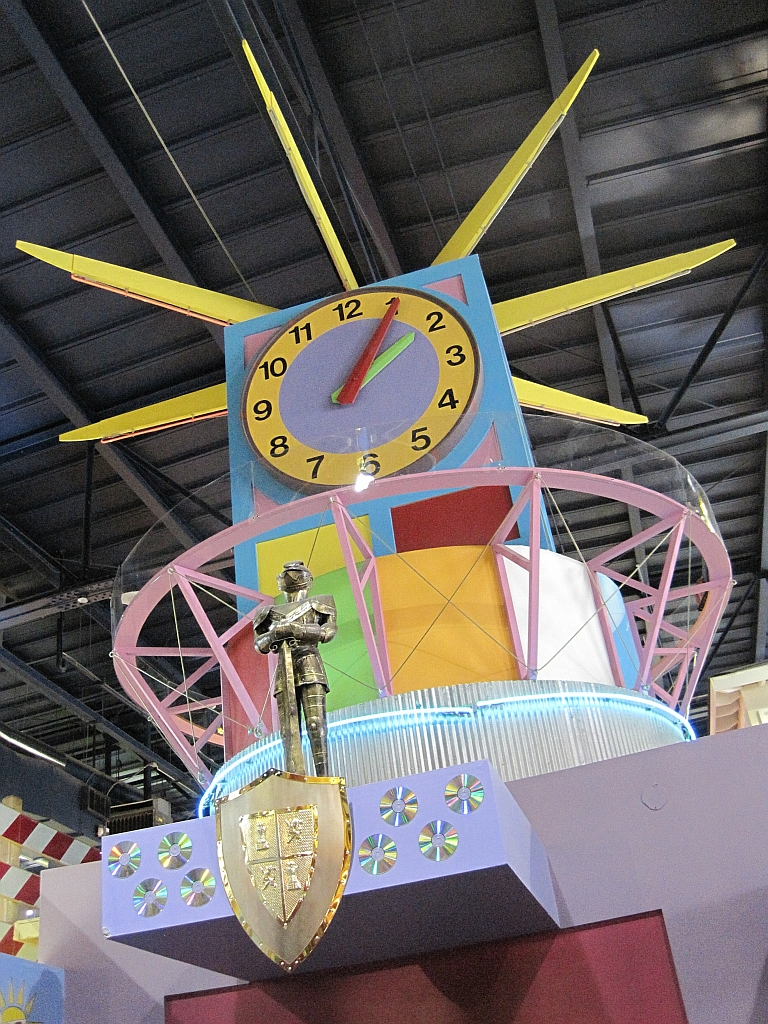

== See also ==
- List of museums in Tennessee
- List of children's museums in the United States
