= Michael L. Jackson =

Michael L. Jackson may refer to:

- Michael Lee Jackson is a US guitarist
- Michael L. Jackson, former member of the Louisiana House of Representatives and candidate in the United States House of Representatives elections in Louisiana, 2008
