= Mike Jackson (retailing) =

American business executive (born 1954)

- Born: 1953 (age 72–73); Oconto, WI, US
- Citizenship: United States
- Education: University of Wisconsin-Green Bay
- Occupations: former President and COO of Supervalu

Mike Jackson is the former president and chief operating officer (COO) of Supervalu.

== Early life and education ==
Jackson was born in 1954 in Oconto, Wisconsin.

As a teenager, he worked part-time at the A&P store in Oconto.

While attending the University of Wisconsin-Green Bay, Jackson worked the midnight to 8 a.m. shift at the Red Owl store in Green Bay, Wisconsin. In 1976, Jackson graduated from the University of Wisconsin-Green Bay with a degree in Managerial Systems.

== Career ==
Soon after graduating college, Jackson became a store manager for Red Owl.

In 1979, Jackson became a retail counselor for the Green Bay division of Supervalu.

In 1995, Jackson became president of the Northwest Region of Supervalu.

In 1999, Jackson was named senior vice president of operations for Retail Food Companies at Supervalu.

In 2001, Jackson was named executive vice president and president of Distribution Food Companies of Supervalu in 2001.

In 2005, Jackson was named president and chief operating officer (COO) of Supervalu. While CEO, Jackson also was on the IGA board of directors and was chairman of the National Grocer's Association.

In 2007, the University of Wisconsin-Green Bay awarded Jackson the Distinguished Alumni award for his work with Supervalu.

In 2009, Jackson announced his retirement from Supervalu.

In 2010, Jackson became the president and chief executive officer (CEO) of the National Grocer's Association (NGA).

In 2011, Jackson joined the board of directors for iControl Systems. He will also be senior advisor to iControl President and CEO Tal Zlotnitsky.
