= Mike Jackson (musician) =

American jazz musician

Mike Jackson (December 23, 1888, Louisville, Kentucky – June 21, 1945, New York City) was an American jazz pianist and composer.

The details of Jackson's early life are not known. In 1921, he began composing songs for the publisher Joe Davis, and soon after worked as an accompanist for a number of early jazz and blues recordings, with Clara Smith, Alberta Hunter, Laura Smith, Thomas Morris (including the New Orleans Blue Five and the Dixie Jazzers Washboard Band), Perry Bradford, and Buddy Christian. He also recorded under his own name as Jackson and His Southern Stompers. With Morris, he worked in the vaudeville show The Wicked Age in 1927. He emigrated to Montreal in 1928, but returned to New York in 1930, where he continued working as a composer.

His compositions included "The Louisville Blues", written with Bob Ricketts in 1921 and recorded by W.C. Handy in 1923; "Scandal Blues" and "Black Hearse Blues", both written in 1925; and "Slender, Tender and Tall" and "Hey, Knock Me a Kiss", both of which were recorded by Jimmie Lunceford and Louis Jordan among others.
