= StorageMart =

Self-storage facility chain

- Industry: Self-storage
- Founded: 1999; 27 years ago
- Founder: Gordon Burnam
- Headquarters: Columbia, Missouri, United States
- Number of locations: 254
- Area served: US, Canada, UK
- Key people: Mike Burnam (president); Cris Burnam (CEO); Ryan McKenzie (CFO)
- Owner: Burnam family E. Stanley Kroenke, GIC; Cascade Investment, L.L.C.
- Subsidiaries: Manhattan Mini Storage; PhoneSmart
- Website: www.storage-mart.com

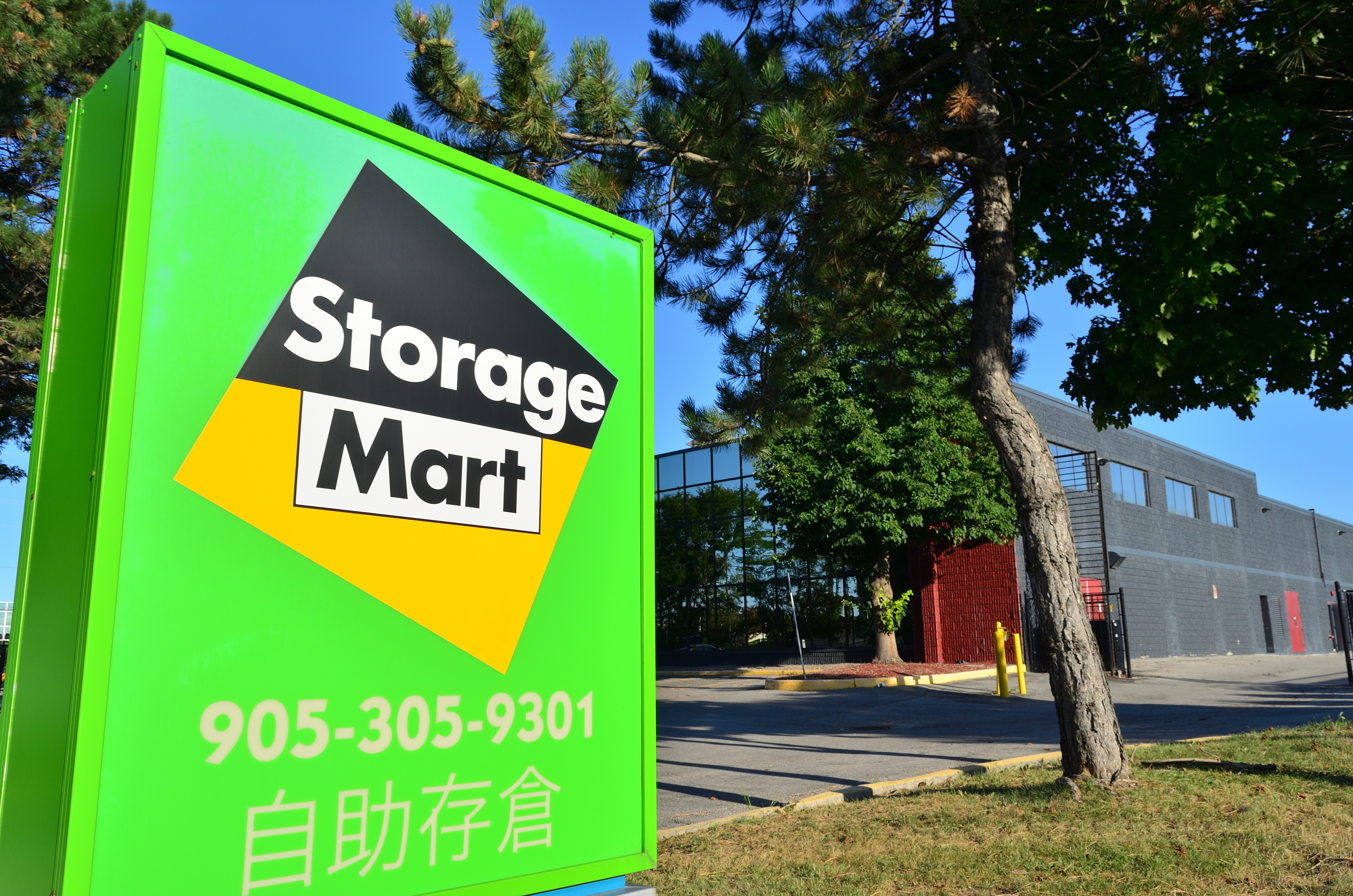
StorageMart

StorageMart, headquartered in Columbia, Missouri, operates over 250 self-storage facilities in the United States, Canada and the UK.

== History ==
=== Early history ===
The company was founded by Gordon Burnam (1931-2017) who had founded Storage Trust, which became a public company in 1994 and was acquired by Public Storage for $600 million in 1999.

StorageMart used non-traditional buildings to house its storage facilities, including the use of a 10-story mid-rise building in Miami, Florida. This allowed the company to open facilities that were easily accessible for urban dwellers, and camouflage these facilities such that they appear to be just another office or residential complex. By the end of 2001, the firm had opened 31 facilities across the US, including both traditional storage units and climate-controlled units capable of housing more perishable or sensitive goods like wine.

=== Expansion ===
In March 2005, the company purchased five properties in Texas.

By May 2005, the company had facilities in 11 states.

In 2007, the company expanded into Canada, and had 70 properties comprising 5 million square feet.

In 2011 and 2012, 640,000 square feet of solar collectors was installed on the roofs of storage locations in Toronto, providing 3 megawatts of power.

In 2009, TKG-StorageMart Canada acquired InStorage for about $416 million. This increased the number of storage facilities to 120, making it one of the largest privately owned storage companies in North America and the largest in Canada.

As of 2013, the firm had 132 storage facility locations in the US and Canada.

In 2014, it purchased 31 additional facilities. By 2016 the company had 172 locations.

In 2016, StorageMart acquired Big Box Storage Centres for £100 million. It owned 15 locations in southeastern England comprising 674,756 square feet in 9,655 units.

StorageMart acquired Manhattan Mini Storage in 2021, making it the largest private self storage REIT worldwide.

In 2026, StorageMart was recognized as the #1 Climate-Controlled Storage Chain by Reviewed Readers' Choice Awards.

== In popular media ==
StorageMart facilities have been featured on shows including Storage Wars and Storage Wars: Canada.
