= Mike and Michelle Jackson =

Australian multi-instrumental duo and children's entertainers

Mike and Michelle Jackson were an Australian multi-instrumental duo principally known as children's entertainers. Between 1979 and 1986, the pair featured in a national TV Show (Playmates on ABC Television), created ten albums (three Gold and one Platinum), produced three songbooks and they teamed up with Western Australian author/storyteller Kel Watkins to create an instructional book, String Games for Beginners. They had two albums released through A&M Records in Canada and toured extensively throughout Australia, Canada, New Zealand, and the U.S. (Alaska).

== History ==
Mike and Michelle, both singers and multi-instrumental musicians, met on stage at the 1979 Kapunda Celtic Music Festival and married soon after. They toured Australia, New Zealand, Canada and the U.S. almost non-stop for 7 years and in between tours they created three songbooks, co-wrote an instruction book for string figure novices and recorded ten albums - two collections of Australian folk music for adults and eight for children. The bulk of their thousands of performances together were Arts in Education performances designed to introduce children to a wide range of unusual instruments and encourage them to play music.

Mike and Michelle's children's albums were a huge success with their second, Playmates going Platinum and the rest of their first four kids' discs going 'Gold' in Australia. They had two North American releases, Bunyips, Bunnies and Brumbies and Playmates, which were released in Canada on Sharon, Lois and Bram's Elephant Records label, distributed by A&M Records. They were featured artists on the ABC TV program Playmates and regular contributors to many other 1980s Australian children's shows.

In 1986, the pair went their separate ways. Mike Jackson has continued touring, writing and recording both in Australia and internationally.

== The duo ==
=== Mike Jackson ===
Mike Jackson (born Fishtoft, Lincolnshire, England) emigrated to Australia in 1970. He taught himself harmonica in high school and acquired a taste for comic songs from his grandfather and the radio. He branched out onto other instruments and acquired a reputation for being able to get a tune out of almost anything.

=== Michelle Jackson ===
Michelle Jackson (born Noosa Heads, Queensland, Australia) already played guitar; fiddle; and mandolin when she met Mike and quickly added a number of other instruments to her list of skills.

== Discography ==
Title	Details	Certification
Patchwork	Released: 1980; Label: Larrikin Records (LRF052)	
Bunyips, Bunnies & Brumbies	Released: 1981; Label: Larrikin Records (LFN 8308)	
The Roaring Days	Released: 1982; Label: Larrikin Records (LRF-101)	
Playmates	Released: 1983; Label: ABC Records (L 27115)	
Ain't It Great To Be Crazy	Released: 1985; Label: ABC Records (L 27156)	ARIA: Gold
