= AutoNation =

American automotive retailer

AutoNation, Inc.

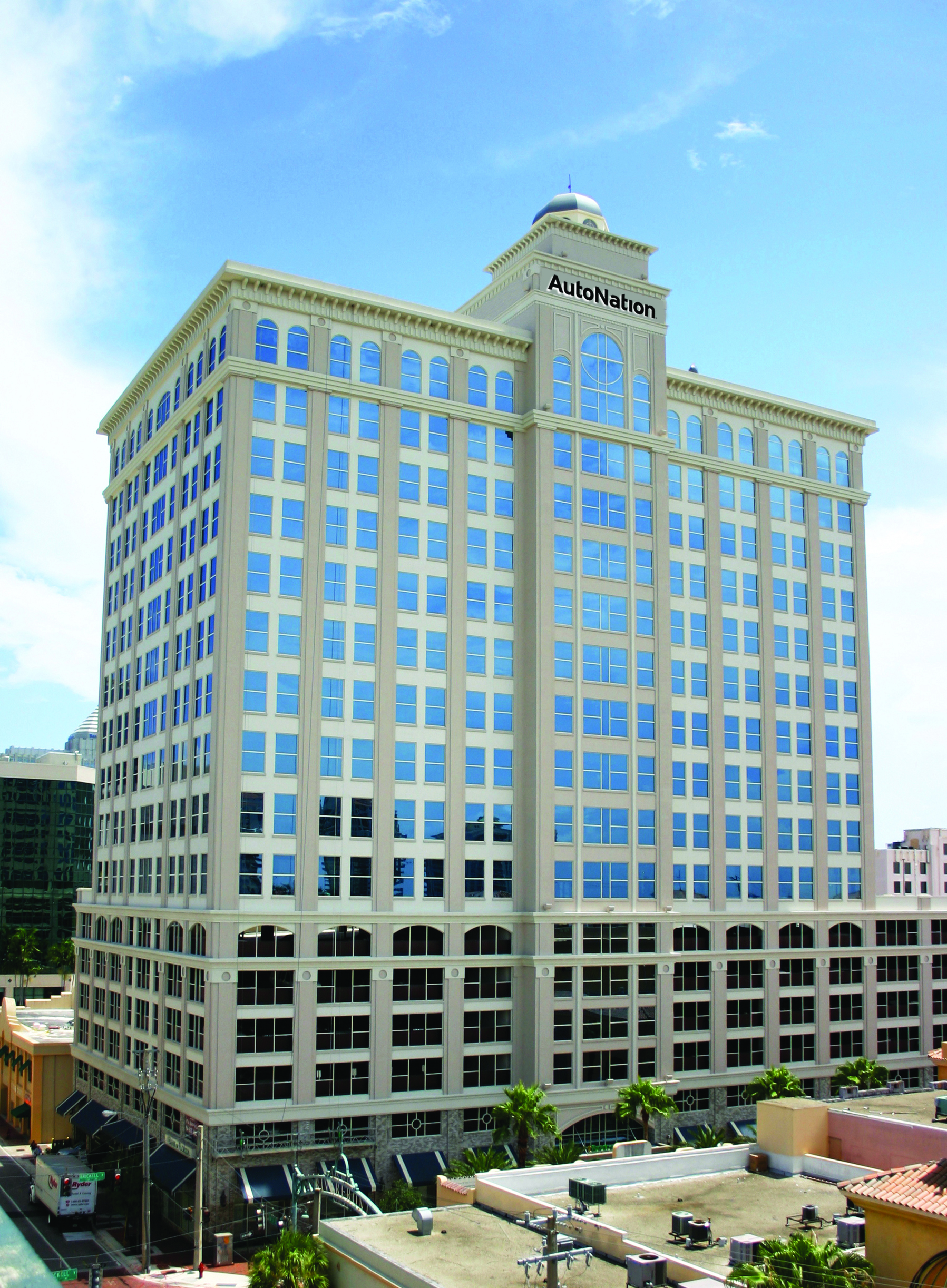
- Headquarters in Fort Lauderdale, Florida
- Type: Public
- Traded as: NYSE: AN; S&P 400 component
- Industry: Car dealership
- Founded: 1996; 30 years ago
- Founder: H. Wayne Huizenga
- Headquarters: Fort Lauderdale, Florida, U.S., United States
- Key people: Mike Manley (CEO); Jeffrey Butler (President)
- Revenue: ▲US$27.6 billion (2025)
- Net income: ▼US$649 million (2025)
- Number of employees: 25,100 (2024)
- Website: autonation.com

AutoNation, Inc. is an American automotive retailer based in Fort Lauderdale, Florida, which provides new and pre-owned vehicles and associated services in the United States. The company was founded by Wayne Huizenga in 1996, starting with twelve AutoNation locations, and now has more than 300 retail outlets.

AutoNation continued growing by acquiring other companies in the car rental business such as National Car Rental, Spirit Rent-A-Car, Value Rent-A-Car, Snappy Car Rental and more.

In 2011, AutoNation was the first auto retailer in the United States to sell a total of eight million vehicles.

== History ==
=== 1996–2008 ===
Before its acquisition by Republic Industries in 1997, but under the early division brand name "AutoNation", the company was a growing network of used automobile superstores. In 1995, H. Wayne Huizenga of Republic Industries became chairman of the board of directors and through Republic's ownership of AutoNation, sought to expand its business into used auto sales throughout the United States. Republic's sales for 1995 were $5.2 billion.

In 1996, Republic Industries began purchasing new car dealerships and offering long-term contracts to owners who joined the newly created automotive division of Republic Industries, which led to the company operating twelve retail locations under the "AutoNation" brand. Later that year, Alamo Rent A Car was purchased by Republic Industries for $625 million, and a 2-for-1 stock split in Republic stock was also completed.

In 1997, Republic continued its acquisitions in the car rental business with the purchase of National Car Rental, Spirit Rent-A-Car, Value Rent-A-Car, Snappy Car Rental, and EuroDollar Rent A Car. Huizenga had Republic start consolidating operations between new and used cars and its rental companies into one operation. Acquiring six Saturn dealerships in Arizona and Florida, Republic sold the dealerships to Saturn in 1997 because they did not generate enough sales, despite being a successful brand.

In 1997, the company acquired Maroone Automotive Group of Buffalo, New York and Florida for $200 million in Republic stock.

In an attempt to expand the company's electronic security division, the company offered to purchase ADT. The acquisition failed, and in October 1997, Republic sold its electronic security division.

Republic Industries offered in July 1998 an initial public offering of its original core waste disposal business as Republic Services and it was from this sale of 36% of Republic Services stock, the company netted $1.4 billion to be used to fund the new company being formed. As a result of this sale, the company changed its name to AutoNation to highlight its focus on the automobile industry.

In 1998, CarMax brought a lawsuit against Republic for copyright and trademark infringement. CarMax received a $50 million jury award in its lawsuit, but it was overturned on appeal in 1998.

In April 1998, competitor Drivers' Mart was purchased for $40 million. The remaining 64% of Republic Services was divested to Republic Industries shareholders in 1999. The company's first chief executive officer (CEO), Steve Berrard, eventually resigned from the company in July 1999.

Mike Jackson, the new CEO, previously of Mercedes Benz USA, moved to spin off the car rental business as "ANC Rental" and close all newly built "AutoNation USA" used car megastores, due to losses of $25 million per quarter. Plans to brand all automotive retail stores as "AutoNation stores" were cancelled. A rebranding of a more recognizable 'regional brand' focus was instituted.

In January 2003, Jackson was named chairman of the board, replacing Huizenga. On October 24, 2005, the AutoNation building in downtown Fort Lauderdale suffered significant damage due to Hurricane Wilma. The company has since transferred to another nearby building.

In 2006, Mike Jackson, CEO of AutoNation announced that his company would be reducing orders from the three major vehicle manufacturers as General Motors, Ford and Chrysler in 2007 and altered the company's purchase pattern to include purchasing more imported vehicles as BMW, Mercedes and Lexus, due to anticipated view of further market share losses by US automakers. resulting in high dealer

=== 2009–present ===
In 2009, during the great recession, AutoNation announced a newly formed AutoNation Payment Protection program, promising that the dealership will buy back any car at market value, should the owner lose their job. By 2011, AutoNation was the first auto retailer in the U.S. to sell a total of 8 million vehicles.

In January 2013, AutoNation announced that it would replace localized brand names of its car retail operations with its own name. This re-branding across the US was supported and approved by the major automotive manufacturers, including GM, Ford, Chrysler, Nissan, Toyota, Honda, VW and Hyundai. It involved a total of 210 franchises operating under previously assigned local group names. In May 2013, AutoNation partnered with Indy Car Series Champion Ryan-Hunter Reay to support his "Racing for Cancer" charity. This charity served as a key component of the AutoNation cancer charity program which was founded as a 501(c)(3) charitable organization. In August 2013, AutoNation announced the sale of its 9 millionth vehicle which was a record achievement for the industry.

On April 11, 2017, USA Today wrote that AutoNation's CEO Mike Jackson questioned the market value of Tesla, the maker of electric cars, by saying that Tesla is "either one of the great Ponzi schemes of all time or it’s gonna work out." The previous day, Tesla passed General Motors as the most valuable American automotive manufacturer, measured by its market capitalization. Jackson also said, "Clearly General Motors is undervalued and Tesla is overvalued. Anybody can see that." In June 2017, AutoNation sold a total of 11 million vehicles. On November 2, 2017, AutoNation announced that Waymo, a developer of self-driving technology, enlisted AutoNation to maintain and repair their driverless vehicles fleet.

During the coronavirus pandemic, AutoNation faced criticism after reports in The Washington Post revealed that the company applied for at least $266 Million in SBA Paycheck Protection Program loan under the CARES Act in order to allow at least 7,000 employees who had been furloughed to return to work and received up to $95 Million in funds for its over 300 dealerships located throughout the United States. SBA Paycheck Protection Program loans were originated by commercial banks, credit unions, and other financial institutions; according to AutoNation's Form 8-K filed with the Securities and Exchange Commission on March 26, the company's "administrative agent" and lender as of the filing date was JPMorgan Chase Bank, N.A. On April 24, AutoNation announced that it would be returning $77 Million to J.P Morgan.

Cheryl Miller resigned her position as CEO for AutoNation in July 2020. She was replaced by Mike Jackson, who was to fill the role until April 2022. In November 2021, Mike Jackson retired from his 20 years service to AutoNation and was replaced by Mike Manley, previously Head of Americas at Stellantis N.V. and former CEO of Fiat Chrysler Automobiles.

On April 9, 2021, it was officially announced that AutoNation had reached a naming rights agreement for the stadium of Fort Lauderdale-based Inter Miami CF. The team's stadium became branded as DRV PNK Stadium, a tie-in with AutoNation's breast cancer awareness campaign.

In 2022, AutoNation sold its 14 millionth vehicle in the United States since its founding.

In January 2023, AutoNation acquired RepairSmith, a full-service mobile solution for automotive repair and maintenance, for $190 million.

== Revenue by product category ==
Revenue by Product Category for 2001
59.5%	New vehicles
19.4%	Used vehicles
12.2%	Parts and service
2.4%	Financing and insurance
6.5%	Other
