= Computer Olympiad =

Multi-games event

The Computer Olympiad is a multi-games event in which computer programs compete against each other. For many games, the Computer Olympiads are an opportunity to claim the "world's best computer player" title. First contested in 1989, the majority of the games are board games but other games such as bridge take place as well. In 2010, several puzzles were included in the competition.

== History ==
Venues and participation
Olympiad	Year	City, country	Venue	Sponsor(s)	Participation	
Olympiad	Year	City, country	Venue	Sponsor(s)	Countries	Programs
1	1989 (August 9–15)	London, England	Park Lane Hotel			84
2	1990 (August 15–21)	London, England				
3	1991 (August 22–25)	Maastricht, Netherlands	Maastricht University			
4	1992 (August 5–11)	London, England	Park Lane Hotel	AST		
5	2000 (August 21–25)	London, England	Alexandra Palace			
6	2001 (August 18–23)	Maastricht, Netherlands	Maastricht University	CMG		
7	2002 (July 5–11)	Maastricht, Netherlands	Maastricht University			
8	2003 (November 23–27)	Graz, Austria	Dom im Berg and Casineum			
9	2004 (July 3–12)	Ramat Gan, Israel	Bar-Ilan University	Aladdin, ChessBase, Golan Heights Winery; IBM Israel, Intel Israel, Israeli Chess Federation; Israel Ministry of Tourism, Mercury, Pitango; PowerDsine, Rimonim Hotels, City of Ramat-Gan		
10	2005	Taipei, Taiwan				
11	2006	Turin, Italy				
12	2007	Amsterdam, Netherlands				
13	2008	Beijing, China				
14	2009	Pamplona, Spain				
15	2010	Kanazawa, Japan				
16	2011	Tilburg, Netherlands				
17	2013	Yokohama, Japan				
18	2015	Leiden, Netherlands				

Developed in the 1980s by David Levy, the first Computer Olympiad took place in 1989 at the Park Lane Hotel in London. The games ran on a yearly basis until after the 1992 games, when the Olympiad's ruling committee was unable to find a new organiser. This resulted in the games being suspended until 2000 when the Mind Sports Olympiad resurrected them. Recently, the International Computer Games Association (ICGA) has adopted the Computer Olympiad and tries to organise the event on an annual basis.

== Games contested ==
The games which have been contested at each Olympiad are:

Link to event article	Olympiad and year																		Link to participants and results
Link to event article	1	2	3	4	5	6	7	8	9	10	11	12	13	14	15	16	17	18	Link to participants and results
Link to event article	1989	1990	1991	1992	2000	2001	2002	2003	2004	2005	2006	2007	2008	2009	2010	2011	2013	2015	Link to participants and results
Abalone								check											Abalone
Amazons					check	check	check	check	check	check		check	check	check	check	check	check		Amazons
Awari	check	check	check	check	check														Awari
Backgammon	check	check		check			check	check			check	check				check			Backgammon
Bridge	check	check	check	check			check												Bridge
Chess	check	check	check	check										check				check	Chess
Chinese Chess	check	check	check	check		check	check	check	check	check	check	check	check	check	check	check	check		Chinese chess
Chinese Dark Chess															check		check	check	Chinese dark chess
Clobber										check	check				check	check	check	check	Clobber
Connect Four	check																		Connect Four
Connect6											check	check	check	check	check	check	check	check	Connect6
Dominoes	check																		Dominoes
Gin rummy				check															Gin rummy
GIPF						check													GIPF
Octi									check										Octi
Poker								check											Poker
Pool										check	check		check						Pool

== 1st–5th Olympiads (1989–1992) ==
Game	1989	1990	1991	1992 (5–11 Aug) London, England
Awari	(gold) Marco (R. Nierat), (silver) Wali (E. van der Schilden), (bronze) Conchus (S. Thomas)	(gold) Lithidon (University of Limburg); (silver) Marco (R. Nierat)	(gold) Lithidion (V. Allis and M. van der Meulen); MyProgram (E. van Riet Paap)	(gold) Lithidion (M. van der Meulen, NL); (silver) Marvin (T. Lincke, CH); (bronze) Juju (UK)
Backgammon	(gold) Neurogammon (Gerald Tesauro, CA); (silver) Video Gammon (R. Hoogerhyde), (bronze) Saitek Backgammon (Treesoft)	(gold) Video Gammon (R. Hoogerhyde); (silver) Prospero (R. Mills)	-	(gold) Bax (K.-U. Koschnik, DE); (silver) Maestro 1.0 (J. Boyan, US); (bronze) Video Gammon (R. Hoogerhyde, US)
Bridge	(gold) Acol Master Bridge (Paul Jones); (silver) Vtech (Tony Guilfoyle); (bronze) Oxford Bridge 3 (Andrew Bracher)	(gold) Bridge Baron (T. Throop and T. Guilfoyle); (silver) Oxford Bridge (A. Bracher)	(gold) Bridge Baron (T. Throop and T. Guilfoyle); (silver) Pupil; (bronze) Bridge King (J. Leber and G. Scholz)	(gold) Bridge King (J. Leber and G. Scholz, DE); (silver) Bridge Baron (T. Throop and T. Guilfoyle, (UK); (bronze) Alpha Bridge (A. Lopatin, RU)
Checkers	(gold) Chinook (J. Schaeffer); (silver) Checkers! (G. Dodgen); (bronze) Tournament Checkers (D. Butler)	(gold) Colossus (M. Bryant); (silver) Chinook (Jonathan Schaeffer); (bronze) Checkermate (D. Oldbury and A. Millett)	-	-
Chess	(gold) REBEL (Ed Schroeder); (silver) Mephisto (R. Lang); (bronze) Fidelity (Kathe and Dan Spracklen)	(gold) Mephisto (R. Lang); (silver) REBEL (E. Schroeder); (bronze) Zugzwang (P. Mysliwietz and R. Feldman)	(gold) The ChessMachine WK-version (E. Schroeder); The King (J. de Koning); (bronze) Chessplayer 2175 (C. Whittington)	(gold) HIARCS 6.72 (M. Uniacke, (UK); (gold) The King (J. de Koning, NL); (gold) Genesis (E. Riet Paap, NL)
Chinese Chess	(gold) Acer Chinese Chess (Y. Shi-Shun); (silver) Chinese Chess Expert Acme (K-M. Ts'ao); (bronze) Elephant (S-C. Hsu)	(gold) Elephant (S-C. Hsu); (silver) Chinese Chess Expert (K-M. Ts'ao); (bronze) NKS (H.S. Long and S. Zi)	(gold) Abyss (C. Ye); (gold) Surprise (R. Wu)	(gold) Surprise (R. Wu, CH); (silver) Elephant (S.-H. Hsu, TW)
Connect Four	(gold) Victor (V. Allis); (silver) Heap (M. Taylor); (bronze) Four Blitz (H. van der Zijden)	-	-	-
Dominoes	(gold) LUciano (D. Borrajo); (silver) Seneca (M. Alicia Perez); (bronze) Rio de la Plata (E. Gramajo)	-	-	-
Draughts	(gold) Dios '89 (E. van Riet Paap); (silver) Truus (S. Keetman); (bronze) McDammen (R.P.G. van Bemmelen)	-	(gold) Truus (S. Keetman); (silver) Dam 1.3 (H. Jetten); (bronze) McDammen (R. P. G. van Bemmelen)	(gold) Tn 83 (A. R. D. van Bergen, NL); (silver) Dynamo (A. Millet, (UK)
Gin rummy	-	-	-	(gold) Rummymate (RU); (silver) Ginny (RU)
Go 19x19	(gold) SWISS Explorer (A. Kierulf); (silver) Goliath (M. Boon), Star of Poland (J. Kraszek)	(gold) Go Intellect (K. Chen); (silver) SWISS Explorer (A. Kierulf and M. Müller); (bronze) Go 4 (M. Reiss)	(gold) Goliath (M. Boon); (silver) Go Intellect (K-H. Chen); (bronze) Explorer 90 (M. Müller)	(gold) Go Intellect (K-H. Chen, US); (silver) Go 4.3 (M. Reiss, (UK); (bronze) Archmage (S.-C. Hsu and J.-C. Yan, TW); (bronze) Neuron (RU)
Go 9x9	(gold) Dragon (D-Y. Lin); (silver) Go Intellect (K. Chen); (bronze) Goliath (M. Boon)	(gold) Go Intellect (K. Chen); (silver) Go 4 (M. Reiss); (bronze) Dragon (D-Y. Lin)	(gold) Explorer 90 (M. Müller); (gold) Go Intellect (K-H. Chen); (bronze) Goliath (M. Boon)	(gold) Go 4.3 (M. Reiss, (UK); (silver) Go Intellect (K-H. Chen, US); (bronze) Dragon (D.-Y. Lin, TW)
Gomoku	(gold) Matena (A. Frolov); (silver) Homoku Sapiens (N. Alexandrov); (bronze) Domino (M. Muron and J. Novotny)	(gold) Stone System (N. Alexandrov, M. Trukhan, and A. Grigoriev); (silver) Matena (A. Frolov); (bronze) Solid (A. Dolinsky); (bronze) XOXOXO (Lev Ilkov)	(gold) Vertex (A. Shaposhnikov and A. Nosovsky); (silver) Neuro-GM; (bronze) Stone System (N. Alexandrov, M. Trukhan and A. Grigoriev)	(gold) Victoria (V. Allis and L. Schoenmaker, NL); (silver) Polygon (J. Uiterwijk, NL); (silver) Neuron (RU)
Nine men's morris	-	-	(gold) Bushy 4.0 (R. Gasser); (silver) IIF Moris (M. Leineweber)	-
Othello	(gold) Polygon (A. Selby); (silver) Comp'oth (F. Aguillon); (bronze) Badia (M. van Tien)	(gold) Dumbo (T. Duykers); (silver) Vers2 (B. de Wolf); (bronze) Microb (M. Claverie)	(gold) Prothello (L. Jansen); (silver) Mast 91 (R. Kroonenberg); (bronze) Rev91 (J. Buijs)	(gold) Othel du Nord (J.-C. Delbarre, FR); (silver) Aida (J. Gnodde, NL); (bronze) JacP'Oth (P. Gailhac, FR)
Qubic	-	(gold) Qubic (A. Grigoriev); (silver) Cube (M. Burton)	(gold) QBig (V. Allis and P. Schoo); (silver) 3D3T (A. Grigoriev)	
Renju	(gold) Renju Sapiens (A. Grigoriev); (gold) Tandy Renju (R. Lang)	(gold) Renju Fan (N. Alexandrov, M. Trukhan, and A. Grigoriev); (silver) XOXOXO (L. Ilkov)	(gold) Vertex (A. Shaposhnikov and A. Nosovsky); (silver) Neuro-RN; (bronze) Stone System (N. Alexandrov, M. Trukhan and A. Grigoriev)	(gold) Neuron (RU); (silver) Zero Club (Latvia, LV); (bronze) Xokk (FI)
Scrabble	(gold) Crab (A. Appel, G. Jacobson, G. Thomas, and S. Thomas); (silver) Tyler (A. Frank); (bronze) Quetzal (T. Guilfoyle and R. Hooker)	(gold) TSP (J. Homan); (silver) Crab (G. Jacobson); (bronze) Tyler (A. Frank)	(gold) TSP (J. Homan); (silver) Tyler (A. Frank)	(gold) Quetzal (T. Guilfoyle and R. Hooker, UK); (silver) Tyler (A. Frank, US); (bronze) Trouble (NL)

== 6th–10th Olympiads (2000–2004) ==
After an eight-year hiatus, the Computer Olympiad was revived by bringing it into the Mind Sports Olympiad. The chess competition was a special event, since it was adopted by the International Correspondence Chess Association (ICCA) as the 17th World Microcomputer Chess Championship (WMCC 2000). The 5th Olympiad was in 2000 at London's Alexandra Palace; the 6th, in 2001 at Ad Fundunm at Maastricht University; the 7th, in 2002 in Maastricht; the 8th, in 2003 in Graz; and the 9th, in 2004 in Ramat Gan. The 7th Olympiad was adopted by the ICCA as the 10th World Computer Chess Championship (WCCC), and the 8th was held in conjugation with both 11th WCCC and the 10th Advances in Computer Games Conference. Because of this, no medals were awarded for the two chess events. The 9th was held in conjugation with WCCC and the Computers and Games 2004 Conference; no medals were awarded to the two chess events. Jonathan Schaeffer and J. W. H. M. Uiterwijk were the tournament directors.

Game	2000 (21–25 Aug) London, England	2001 (18–23 Aug) Maastricht, Netherlands	2002 (5–11 July) Maastricht, Netherlands	2003 (23–27 Nov) Graz, Austria	2004 (3–12 July) Ramat Gan, Israel
Abalone	-	-	-	(gold) AbaPro (T. Werner) (AT); (silver) Nacre (P. Sommerlund, DK)	-
Amazons	(gold) 8QP (J. de Koning, NL); (silver) Yamazon (H. Yamashita, JP); (bronze) Anky (P. Hensgens, NL)	(gold) 8QP (J. de Koning, NL); (silver) Aska (Iida lab, JP); (bronze) Invader (Avetisyan, US)	(gold) Amazong (J. Lieberum, DE); (silver) 8QP (J. de Koning, NL); (bronze) Invader (Avetisyan, US)	(gold) Amazong (J. Lieberum, DE)} (silver) Invader (Avetisyan, US); (bronze) 8QP (J. de Koning, NL)	(gold) 8QP (J. de Koning, NL); (silver) TAS (Y. Higashiuchi, JP)
Awari	(gold) Marvin (T. Lincke, CH); (silver) Softwari (R. van der Goot, CA)	-	-	-	-
Backgammon	-	-	(gold) BGBlitz (F. Berger, DE); (silver) Gnubg (A. Müller, DE)	(gold) BGBlitz (F. Berger, DE); (silver) Gnubg (A. Müller, DE)	-
Bridge	-	-	(gold) Wbridge5 (Costel, FR); (silver) Jack (H. Kuijff, NL)	-	-
Chess	(gold) Shredder (S. Meyer-Kahlen, DE); (silver) Fritz (F. Morsch, NL); (bronze) Rebel (E. Schroeder, NL); (bronze) Chess Tiger (C. Theron, FR); Rybka disqualified; gold rewarded	(gold) Junior (A. Ban, IL); (silver) Quest (F. Morsch, NL); (bronze) Shredder (S. Meyer-Kahlen, DE)	(gold) Junior (A. Ban, IL); (silver) Shredder (S. Meyer-Kahlen, DE); (bronze) Brutus (C. Donninger, AT)	-	-
Chinese chess	-	(gold) ELP (J-C. Chen, TW); (silver) SG8.2 (Cheng, TW); (bronze) Abyss'99 (T. Marsland, CA)	(gold) ELP (J-C. Chen, TW); (silver) Shiga 8.1 (S-J. Yen, TW); (bronze) Xie Xie (P. Tang, E. Castillo, FR)	(gold) ZMBL (Z. Tu, CN); (silver) Xie Xie (P. Tang, E. Castillo, FR); (bronze) ELP (J-C. Chen, TW)	(gold) Contemplation (K-C Wu, TW); (silver) ELP (J-C. Chen, TW)
Dots and Boxes	-	-	(gold) Control Freak (W. Fraser, US); (silver) Seicho (H. Iida, JP)	(gold) Control Freak (W. Fraser, US); (silver) Deep Beige (D. Bochenski, (UK); (bronze) Damepo (H. Iida, JP)	-
Draughts	-	-	(gold) Dam 2.2 (H. Jetten) (Netherlands); (silver) DIOS (C. Jurriens, NL); (bronze) Damage (B. Tuyt, NL)	(gold) Sjende Blyn (J. Wiersma, NL); (silver) Dam 2.2 (H. Jetten, NL); (bronze) TD King (T. Tillemans, CH)	-
GIPF	-	(gold) GF1 (K. van den Branden) (Belgium); (silver) Gipfted (D. Wentink, NL)	-	-	-
Go 19x19	(gold) GoeMate (Z. Chen, CN); (silver) Go4++ (M. Reiss, (UK); (bronze) Aya (H. Yamashita, JP)	-	(gold) Go4++ (M. Reiss, (UK); (silver) Go Intellect (K-H. Chen, US); (bronze) GNU Go (I. Wallin) (Sweden)	(gold) GNU Go (I. Wallin) (Sweden); (silver) GoAhead (P. Woitke, DE); (bronze) Go Intellect (K-H. Chen, US)	(gold) Go Intellect (K-H. Chen, US); (silver) The Many Faces of Go (D. Fotland, US); (bronze) Indigo (B. Bouzy, FR)
Go 9x9	-	-	(gold) Go4++ (M. Reiss, (UK); (silver) GNU Go (I. Wallin, SE); (bronze) Go Intellect (K-H. Chen, US)	(gold) Aya (H. Yamashita, JP); (silver) NeuroGo (M. Enzenberger, CA); (bronze) Go Intellect (K-H. Chen, US)	(gold) Go Intellect (K-H. Chen, US); (silver) GnuGo (Free Software Foundation) (international); (bronze) Magog (E. van der Werf, NL)
Hex	(gold) Hexy (V. Anshelevich, US); (silver) Queenbee (J. v. Ryswyck, CA); (bronze) Killerbee (E. Brasa, IT	-	-	(gold) Six (G. Melis) (Hungary); (silver) Mongoose (R. Hayward, CA)	(gold) Six (G. Melis, HU); (silver) Mongoose (R. Hayward, CA)
Lines of Action	(gold) YL (Y. Björnsson, CA); (silver) Mona (D. Billings, CA); (bronze) MIA (M. Winands, NL)	(gold) YL (Y. Björnsson, CA); (silver) MIA II (M. Winands, NL); (bronze) Apprentice (D. Beal, UK)	(gold) YL (Y. Björnsson, CA); (silver) MIA III (M. Winands, NL)); (bronze) (T-T) (H. Iida, JP)	(gold) MIA IV (M. Winands, NL); (silver) BING (B. Helmstetter, FR); (bronze) (T-T) (J. Nagashima, JP)	(gold) MIA 4++ (M. Winands, NL); (silver) BING (B. Helmstetter, FR); (bronze) YL (Y. Björnsson, IS)
Octi 6x7	-	-	-	-	(gold) Testme2 (J. Bacher, CA); (silver) Casbah (C. Sutton, US)
Poker	-	-	-	(gold) Vexbot (University of Alberta GAMES group, CA); (silver) Sparbot (University of Alberta GAMES group, CA)	-
Shogi	(gold) YSS (H. Yamashita, JP); (silver) Shotest 4.1 (J. Rollason, (UK); (bronze) Tacos (H. Tsuyoshi, JP)	(gold) Shotest 5.6 (J. Rollason, (UK); (silver) Spear (R. Grimbergen, NL/JP); (bronze) Tacos (H. Iida, JP)	(gold) ISshogi (Y. Tanase, CA); (silver) Kanazawa under Reiki (S. Todoroki, JP); (bronze) Shotest 5.6 (J. Rollason, (UK)	(gold) YSS (H. Yamashita, JP); (silver) ISshogi (Y. Tanase, JP); (bronze) Tacos (H. Iida, JP)	-

== 10th–14th Olympiads (2005–2009) ==
The 10th Olympiad was in 2005 in Taipei; the 11th, in 2006 in Turin; the 12th, in 2007 at the Amsterdam Science Park; the 13th, in 2008 at the Beijing Golden Century Golf Club; and the 14th, in 2009 in Pamplona. The 10th Olympiad wasa held at the same time and location as the 11th Advances in Computer Games and its organizing committee was made up of J. W. Hellemons (chair), H. H. L. M. Donkers, M. Greenspan, T-s Hsu, H. J. van den Herik, and M. Tiessen. Hand Talk, which won the gold medal in Computer Go, was originally written in assembly language by a retired chemistry professor of Sun Yat-sen University, China. The 11th Olympiad was held in conjugation with the 14th World Computer Chess Championship and the 5th Computer and Games Conference. Human FIDE 37th Chess Olympiad co-hosted this event; the 12th, with the 15th World Computer Chess Championship and the Computer Games Workshop; the 13th, with the International Computer Games Championship, the World Computer Chess Championship, and a scientific conference on computer games; and the 14th with the World Computer Chess Championship and a scientific conference on computer games.

Rybka was retroactively disqualified from all ICCC events due to plagiarism. Rankings were adjusted appropriately.

Game	2005 (3–6 Sept) Taipei, Taiwan	2006 (25 May-4 June) Turin, Italy	2007 (11–18 June) Amsterdam, Netherlands	2008 (28 Sept-5 Oct) Beijing, China	2009 (10–18 May) Pamplona, Spain
Amazons	(gold) 8QP (J. de Koning, NL); (silver) Invader (Avetisyan, US); (bronze) TAS (Y. Higashiuchi, JP)	-	(gold) 8 Queens Problem (J. de Koning, NL); (silver) Campya (J. Kloetzer, FR)	(gold) Invader (H. Avetisyan, R. Lorentz, US); (silver) 8 Queens Problem (J. de Koning, NL); (bronze) Campya (J. Kloetzer, FR)	(gold) Invader (R. Lorentz, D. Dennison, A. Huerto, M. Reiss, A. Karapetyan, H. Avetisyan, US); (silver) 8 Queens Problem (J. de Koning, NL); (bronze) Campya (J. Kloetzer, FR)
Backgammon	-	(gold) GNU Backgammon (Müller); (silver) BGBlitz (F. Berger, DE)	(gold) Bgblitz (F. Berger, DE); (silver) GNU Backgammon; (bronze) MCgammon (G. Chaslot, F. van Lieshout, BE)	-	-
Chess	-	-	(gold) Zappa (A. Cozie, E. Günes, TR); (silver) Loop (F. Reul, DE; (bronze) GridChess (K. Himstedt, U. Lorenz, et al., DE; (bronze) Shredder (S. Meyer-Kahlen, S. Necchi, DE (Rybka disqualified; gold reawarded)	(gold) HIARCS (M. Uniacke, E. Hallsworth, UK; (silver) Junior (A. Ban, S. Bushinsky, IL); (bronze) Cluster Toga (T. Gaksch, F. Letouzy et al., DE (Rybka disqualified; gold reawarded)	(gold) Rybka (V. Rajlich, US; (silver) Shredder (S. Meyer-Kahlen, DE; (bronze) Sjeng (G-C Pascutto, BE)
Chinese Chess	(gold) XQMASTER (Z. Mingyang, CN); (silver) SHIGA (S.-J. Yen, TW); (bronze) NEUCHESS (W. Jiao, CN	(gold) NeuChess (W. Jiao, CN); (silver) Shiga (S.-J. Yen, TW); (bronze) Deep Elephant (W. Huang, A. Huang, S.S. Lin, TW)	(gold) NeuChess (J. Wang, CN; (silver) Shiga (M-C Cheng, S-J Yen, TW); (bronze) XieXie (P. Tang, E. Castillo, J.T. Pai, FR)	(gold) Intella (C. Chen, Y. Wei, CN); (silver) Cyclone (M. Zhang, CN); (bronze) EThinker (Z. Xu, CN)	(gold) TMSK (B-J Shen, R-P Li, T-S Hsu, TW); (silver) HaQiKi D (H.G. Muller, NL)); (bronze) Chimo (W-J Tseng, W-L Kao, H-H Lin, C-B Hsu, I-C Wu, S-C Hsu, TW)
Clobber	(gold) MILA (M. Winands, NL); (silver) ClobberA (J. Willemson, EE)	(gold) Pan (J. De Koning, NL); (silver) Mila (M. Winands, NL); (bronze) ClobberB (J. Willemson, EE)	-	-	-
Computational Pool	-	-	-	(gold) CueCard (D. Cohen, C. Archibald, A. Altman, US); (silver) PickPocket (M. Smith, (CA); (bronze) Elix (M. Godard, CA)	-
Connect6	-	(gold) NCTU6 (Wu, Chang); (silver) X6 (Liou, Yen); (bronze) EVG (Huang, Hsu)	(gold) X6 (J. Moon-Liou, S-J Yen, TW); (silver) MeinStein (T. van der Storm, NL); (bronze) Kavalan (S-J Yen, TW)	(gold) NCTU6-Lite (P-H Lin, H-X Lin, Y-C Chan, C-P Chen, I-C Wu, TW); (silver) Bitstronger (L. Liang, C. Hao, W. Ruijian, L. Siran, CN); (bronze) NEUConn6 (C-M Xu, CN)	(gold) Bit (L. Liang, C. Hao, W. Ruijian, L. Siran, CN); (silver) MeinStein (T. van der Storm, NL); (bronze) Bit2 (Z. Tang, Z. Li, H. Liu, J.B.M. Xu, CN)
Dots and Boxes	(gold) Deep Beige (D. Bochenski, UK); (silver) Beige Watch (R. Weston, UK; (bronze) ALSOB (P. Bailey, UK	-	-	(gold) The Shark (W. Fraser, US); (silver) Qiyi (L. Lian, CN); (bronze) Matadots (P. Rogers, R. Lorentz, US)	-
Draughts	-	-	-	-	(gold) TDKing (T. Tillemans, CH); (silver) Tornado (F. Mesander, NL); (bronze) Rocky (M. Winands, NL)
Go	-	-	-	(gold) The Many Faces of Go (D. Fotland, US); (silver) MoGo (S. Gelly, Y. Wang, FR); (bronze) Leela (G-C Pascutto, BE)	(gold) Zen (Yamato, JP); (silver) Fuego (M. Enzenberger, M. Müller, B. Arneson, R. Segal, G. Tesauro, (CA); (bronze) MoGo (S. Gelly, Y. Wang, O. Teytaud, J-B Hoock, G. Chaslot, A. Rimmel, FR)
Go 19x19	(gold) Hand Talk (C. Zhixing, CN); (silver) Go Intellect (K-H. Chen, US); (bronze) Aya (H. Yamashita, JP)	(gold) GNU Go (Free Software Foundation); (silver) Go Intellect (K-H. Chen, US); (bronze) Indigo (B. Bouzy, FR)	(gold) MoGo (S. Gelly, Y. Wang, FR); (silver) Crazy Stone (R. Coulom); (bronze) GNU Go	-	-
Go 9x9	(gold) Go Intellect (K-H. Chen, US); (silver) Aya (H. Yamashita, JP); (bronze) Indigo (B. Bouzy, FR)	(gold) Crazy Stone (R. Coulom, FR); (silver) Aya (H. Yamashita, JP); (bronze) Go Intellect (K-H. Chen, US)	(gold) Steenvreter (E. van der Werf, NL); (silver) MoGo (S. Gelly, FR); (bronze) Crazy Stone (R. Coulom, FR)	(gold) The Many Faces of Go (D. Fotland, US); (silver) Leela (G-C Pascutto, BE); (bronze) MoGo (S. Gelly, Y. Wang, O. Teytaud, FR)	(gold) Fuego (M. Enzenberger, M. Müller, B. Arneson, R. Segal, G. Tesauro, (CA); (silver) MoGo (S. Gelly, Y. Wang, O. Teytaud, J-B Hoock, G. Chaslot, A. Rimmel, FR); (bronze) Yogo (P. Yu, F. Xie, CN)
International draughts	-	(gold) TDKing (Tillemans, NL); (silver) SJENDE BLYN (Wiersma, NL); (bronze) Dam 2.2 (Jetten, NL)	(gold) Dam 2.2 (Jetten, NL); (silver) TDKing (T. Tillemans, CH); (bronze) Sjende Blyn (J. Wiersma, NL)	(gold) TDKing (T. Tillemans, CH); (silver) Rocky (M. Winands, NL)	-
Havannah	-	-	-	-	(gold) Wanderer (R. Lorentz, R. Nahue, US); (silver) Shakti (F. Teytaud, O. Teytaud, FR)
Hex	-	(gold) Six (Melis); (silver) Wolve (Hayward); (bronze) Hex Krieger (Rasmussen)	-	(gold) Wolve (B. Arneson, (CA); (silver) MoHex (P. Henderson, (CA); (bronze) Six (G. Melis, HU)	(gold) MoHex (P. Henderson, B. Arneson, R. Hayward, (CA); (silver) Wolve (P. Henderson, B. Arneson, R. Hayward, M. Johanson, M. Kan, M. Müller, G. Ryan, (CA); (bronze) Six (G. Melis, HU)
Kriegspiel	-	(gold) Darkboard (Favini, Ciancarini); (silver) Kbott (Parker)	-	-	(gold) Darkboard (G. Favini, P. Ciancarini) (Italy); (silver) KriegExpert (L. Self, NA); (bronze) Bit (CN)
Lines of Action	-	(gold) MIA (Winands); (silver) YL (Björnsson)	-	-	(gold) Mia 4.51 (M. Winands, NL); (silver) Bit (P. Zhan, CN)
Phantom Go	-	-	(gold) GoLois (T. Cazenave, FR); (silver) InTheDark (J. Bosboom, NL)	(gold) GoLois (T. Cazenave, N. Jouandeau, FR); (silver) Chinese Deep (C. Hao, CN); (bronze) BitStronger (L. Liang, C. Hao, W. Ruijian, L. Siran, CN)	(gold) GoLois (T. Cazenave, N. Jouandeau, FR); (silver) Bit (L. Liang, C. Hao, W. Ruijian, L. Siran, CN)
Pool	(gold) UofA (M. Smith, (CA); (silver) PoolMaster (J.-F. Landry, (CA); (bronze) Elix (M. Godard, (CA)	(gold) PickPocket (M. Smith, (CA); (silver) SkyNet (W. Leckie, (CA); (bronze) Elix (M. Godard, (CA)	-	-	-
Shogi	(gold) Tacos (H. Iida, JP); (silver) YSS (H. Yamashita, JP); (bronze) Spear (R. Grimbergen, JP)	(gold) YSS (H. Yamashita, JP); (silver) Bonanza (Hoki, JP); (bronze) Tacos (H. Iida, JP)	(gold) Tacos (J. Nagashima, H. Iida, H. Tsuyoshi, JP); (silver) Reiki (S. Todoroki, JP); (bronze) HIT+SS (S. Seike, T. Ito, R. Ohguchi, JP)	(gold) Tacos (H. Tsuyoshi, M. Taketoshi, J. Nagashima, J. Hashimoto, T. Matsui, H. Iida, JP); (silver) BitStronger (L. Xiao, M. Junlong, X. Changda, T. Songling, CN); (bronze) HIT+SS (S. Seike, T. Ito, R. Ohguchi)	(gold) Tacos (H. Tsuyoshi, M. Taketoshi, J. Nagashima, J. Hashimoto, T. Matsui, H. Iida, JP); (silver) BitStronger (C. Xu, L. Xiao, M. Junlong, T.S.P. Zhan, CN)
Speed chess	-	-	-	(gold) Sjeng (G-C Pascutto, BE); (silver) HIARCS (M. Uniacke, E. Hallsworth, UK); (bronze) Shredder (S. Meyer-Kahlen, S. Necchi, DE (Rybka disqualified; silver reawarded)	-
Surakarta	-	-	(gold) SIA (M. Winands, NL); (silver) Incognito (I. Auwerda, NL)	(gold) SIA (M. Winands, NL); (silver) BitStronger (Q. Zhi, S. Zhen, T. Hongru, CN)	-

== 15th–18th Olympiads (2010–2015) ==
The 15th Olympiad was held in 2010 in Kanazawa, Japan along with the 18th World Computer Chess Championship (WCCC), and a scientific conference on computer games. The 16th Olympiad was held in 2011 at Tilburg University at the same time as the 19th WCCC. The 17th Olympiad was held in 2013 at Keio University's Collaboration Complex on the Hiyoshi Campus, and was at the same time as the 20th WCCC and a scientific conference on computer games. The 18th Olympiad was in 2015 at Leiden University and was organized by the International Computer Game Association, the Leiden Institute of Advanced Computer Science, and the Leiden Centre of Data Science.

Game	2010 (24 Sept-2 Oct) Kanazawa, Japan	2011 (18–26 Nov) Tilburg, Netherlands	2013 (12–18 Aug) Tokyo, Japan	2015 (29 June-6 July) Amsterdam, Netherlands
2048	-	-	-	(gold) 2048-khyeh (silver) 2048-ghung (bronze) 20486
Amazons	Unknown	Unknown	Unknown	Unknown
Backgammon	-	Unknown	-	-
Chinese chess	(gold) Shiga (M-C Cheng, S-J Yen, TW); (silver) TMSK (B-J Shen, R-P Li, T-S HSU, TW); (bronze) Chimo (W-J Tseng, W-L Kao, H-H Lin, C-B Hsu, I-C Wu, S-C Hsu, TW)	Unknown	Unknown	(gold) Shiga; (silver) Chimo; (bronze) Shark
Chinese dark chess	Unknown	Unknown	(gold) DarkKnight; (silver) Yahari; (bronze) Observer	Unknown
Chu Shogi	-	-	(gold) HaChu; (silver) Deep Nikita	Unknown
Clobber	(gold) Pan.exe (J. de Konig, NL); No other competitors	Unknown	(gold) Pan; (silver) McClobber; (bronze) Deep Nikita	(gold) 8QP; (silver) Deep Nikita
Connect6	Unknown	Unknown	Unknown	Unknown
Diplomacy	-	-	-	(gold) D-Brand (D. de Jonghe); (silver) DipBlue (H. Lopez Cardoso); (bronze) Super Bot (M. Borgt)
Dots and Boxes	(gold) The Shark (W. Fraser, US; (silver) BITPanda (X. Yanchao, Z. Yuting, CH	Unknown	Unknown	Unknown
Draughts	(gold) TDKing (T. Tillemans, CH); (silver) Rocky (M. Winands, NL)	Unknown	(gold) BITDB; (silver) Railgun	(gold) Scan (F. Letouzey); (silver) Damage (B. Tuyt); (bronze) JDraughts (R. van Bemmelen)
EinsStein würfelt nicht!	-	Unknown	(gold) Prophet_WT; (silver) VS_WTN; (bronze) Cloud	(gold) Hanfried; (silver) Deep Nikita; (bronze) Chinese Program
Go	(gold) Erica (S-C Huang, R. Coulom, TW); (silver) Zen (Yamato, JP); (bronze) The Many Faces of Go (D. Fotland, US	-	-	-
Go (9x9)	(gold) MyGoFriend (F. Karger, UK); (silver) Fuego (M. Enzenberger, M. Müller, B. Arneson, R. Segal, G. Tesauro, CA); (bronze) Erica (S-C Huang, R. Coulom, TW)	Unknown	Unknown	(gold) Zen; (silver) Abakus; (bronze) CGI
Go (13x13)	(gold) The Many Faces of Go (D. Fotland, US; (silver) Fuego (M. Enzenberger, M. Müller, B. Arneson, R. Segal, G. Tesauro, CA); (bronze) MoGo (S. Gelly, Y. Wang, O. Teytaud, J-B Hoock, G. Chaslot, A. Rimmel, FR)	Unknown	Unknown	(gold) Zen; (silver) Nomitan; (bronze) Abakus
Go (19x19)	-	Unknown	Unknown	(gold) Zen; (silver) Abakus; (bronze) Nomitan
Havannah	Unknown	Unknown	-	-
Hex	Unknown	Unknown	Unknown	Unknown
Light Up	(silver) Cpuzzler (S-Y Chiu, TW); (bronze) PCCU (S-J Yen, TW)	-	-	Unknown
Lines of Action	-	-	(gold) MC-LOA; (silver) Deep Nikita	(gold) SIA; (silver) Deep Nikita
Mahjong	-	-	(gold) ThousandWind; (silver) Majo; (bronze) Longcat	(gold) VeryLongCat; (silver) ThousandWind; (bronze) Take
Minishogi	(gold) Clair 1/128 (T. Obata, JP); (silver) Shokidoki 0.8 (H.G. Muller, NL); (bronze) 55TACOS (T. Hashimoto, JP)	-	-	-
NoGo	-	Unknown	Unknown	Unknown
Nonograms	(bronze) Cpuzzler (S-Y Chiu, TW)	-	Unknown	Unknown
Nurikabe	Unknown	-	-	-
Phantom Go	Unknown	Unknown	Unknown	Unknown
Quoridor	Unknown	-	-	-
Shogi	(gold) Gekisashi (T. Maruyama, T. Ouchi, R. Takase, Y. Tsuruoka, D. Yokoyama, JP); (silver) Shueso (A. Takeuchi, JP); (bronze) GPS Shogi (T. Tanaka, JP)	Unknown	Unknown	
Shogi (5x5)	-	-	(gold) Shokidoki; (silver) 1/128 Rigan; (bronze) Mattari Yuuchan	Unknown
Surakarta	(gold) SIA (M. Winands, NL); (silver) Qiyi (J. Guo, X. Yang, L. Yunzhao, J. Zhao, CN); (bronze) BITPanda (X. Yanchao, Z. Yutin, CN)	(gold) SIA; (silver) BITSKT; (bronze) Deep Nikita	Unknown	

== 19th–25th Olympiads (2016–2022) ==
The 19th Olympiad was held 27 June – 3 July 2016 and the 20th Olympiad was held 1–7 July 2017, both at Leiden University and organized by the International Computer Game Association, the Leiden Institute of Advanced Computer Science, and the Leiden Centre of Data Science. The 21st Olympiad was held 7–13 July 2018 in Taipei, Taiwan alongside the 10th International Conference on Computers and Games. The World Computer Chess Championships took place from 13–19 July in Stockholm, Sweden. The 22nd Olympiad was held 11–17 August 2019 in Macau, China and the 23rd (2020), 24th (2021), and 25th (2022) Olympiads were held online due to the COVID-19 pandemic.

Game	2019 (11–17 August) Macau, China
Amazons	(gold) SherlockGo (L. Tailin, University of Science and Technology Beijing); (silver) BIT_Amazons (C. Zenghao, Beijing Institute of Technology); (bronze) Queen (T. Cazenave, Paris Dauphine University)
Block Go	(gold) NDHU-Polygames (H-I Lin, National Dong Hwa University); (silver) miny_blockgo (Y-L Chen, National Dong Hwa University)
Breakthrough	(gold) Deep Nikita (A. Lin, Washington Technology University); (silver) TakeABreak (T. Cazenave, Paris Dauphine University); (bronze) BT (Y-C Chen, National Taiwan Normal University)
Chinese checkers	(gold) Jump (J-H Chern (National Taiwan Normal University); (silver) NDHU-Polygames (H-I Lin, National Taiwan Normal University); (bronze) Negentropy (L-N Chen, National Taiwan Normal University)
Chinese chess	(gold) BugCChess (L-Z Yuan); (silver) SHIGA (S-J Yen, National Dong Hwa University); (bronze) Xiexie (P. Tang)
Chinese dark chess	(gold) Yahari (H-Y Wang, National Taipei University and Academia Sinica); (silver) PupilDarkChess (H-I Lin, National Taipei University and Academia Sinica); (bronze) Yanyu 2.0 (H-Y Wang, National Taipei University and Academia Sinica)
Connect 6	(gold) BIT_Connect6 (C. Zenghao, Beijing Institute of Technology); (silver) Kavalan (J-K Yang, Lan Yang Institute of Technology); (bronze) Zeta (C. Zhang, DSGROUP)
Dice-shogi	(gold) Nyanpass (H-Y Wang, National Taipei University); (silver) Deep Nikita (A. Lin, Washington Technology University); (bronze) NDHU-Polygames (H-I Lin, National Taiwan Normal University)
Draughts	(gold) Bit_Draught (H. Youfang, Beijing Institute of Technology)
Einstein Würfelt Nicht	(gold) EWIN (R. Chu, National Chiao Tung University); (silver) VSWTN (Z.Y. Peng, University of Science and Technology Beijing); (bronze) BIT_Einstein (H. Jiacheng, Beijing Institute of Technology)
Fighting Landlord	(gold) I'm a Famer (W. Yu, Chongqing Three Gorges University); (silver) Knight-Landlord (W. Tang, Chongqing University of Technology); (bronze) JAIST_landlord (X. Yuhao, Japan Advanced Institute of Science and Technology)
Go (9x9)	(gold) CGI Go Intelligence (T-h Wei, National Chiao Tung University); (silver) EzGo (Lin, T. Yu, Chang Yuan Christian University)
Hex (11x11)	(gold) BIT_Hex11 (Z. Jie, Beijing Institute of Technology); (silver) Calainosaur (F. Taytaud, University of the Littoral Opal Coast)
Hex (13x13)	(gold) DeepEZO (M. Yamamoto, Hokaido University); (silver) BIT_Hex13 (Z. Jie, Beijing Institute of Technology); (bronze) Calainosaur (F. Teytaud, University of the Littoral Opal Coast)
Kyoto Shogi	(gold) Deep Nikita (A. Lin, Washington Technology University); (silver) CrazyWa (H.G. Muller)
Mahjong	(gold) MahjongJr (Y-C Chen, National Taiwan Normal University); (silver) ZONST Tree (R. Hang, ZONST Data Group); (bronze) SimCat (S-C Tang, National Chiao Tung University)
Shogi (5x5)	(gold) Nyanpass (H-Y Wang, National Taipei University); (silver) Shokidoki (H.G. Muller); (bronze) EVG1.5 (S-C Hsu, Chang-Jung Christian University)
NoGo	(gold) CZF (L.C. Lan, National Chiao Tung University); (silver) Deep Nikita (A. Lin, Washington Technology University); (bronze) Noeven (C. Zhang, DSGROUP)
Nonogram	(gold) Requiem (Y-C Chen, National Taiwan Normal University); (silver) The Heir (Y-R Guo, National Taichung University of Education); (bronze) (bronze) Uncertainty (Y-R Guo, National Taichung University of Education)
Othello	(gold) Othello LTBeL (Y-S Jim, National Dong Hwa University); (silver) Royal (C. Na-Yuan, National Taiwan Normal University); (bronze) Curiosity10 (W-Y Hsu, National Chiao Tung University)
Surakarta	(gold) Deep Nikita (A. Lin, Washington Technology University); (silver) FuChou (Y-C Chen, National Taiwan Normal University); (bronze) VSSurakarta (Z. Pei, University of Science and Technology Beijing)

== Summary by game ==
=== Abalone ===
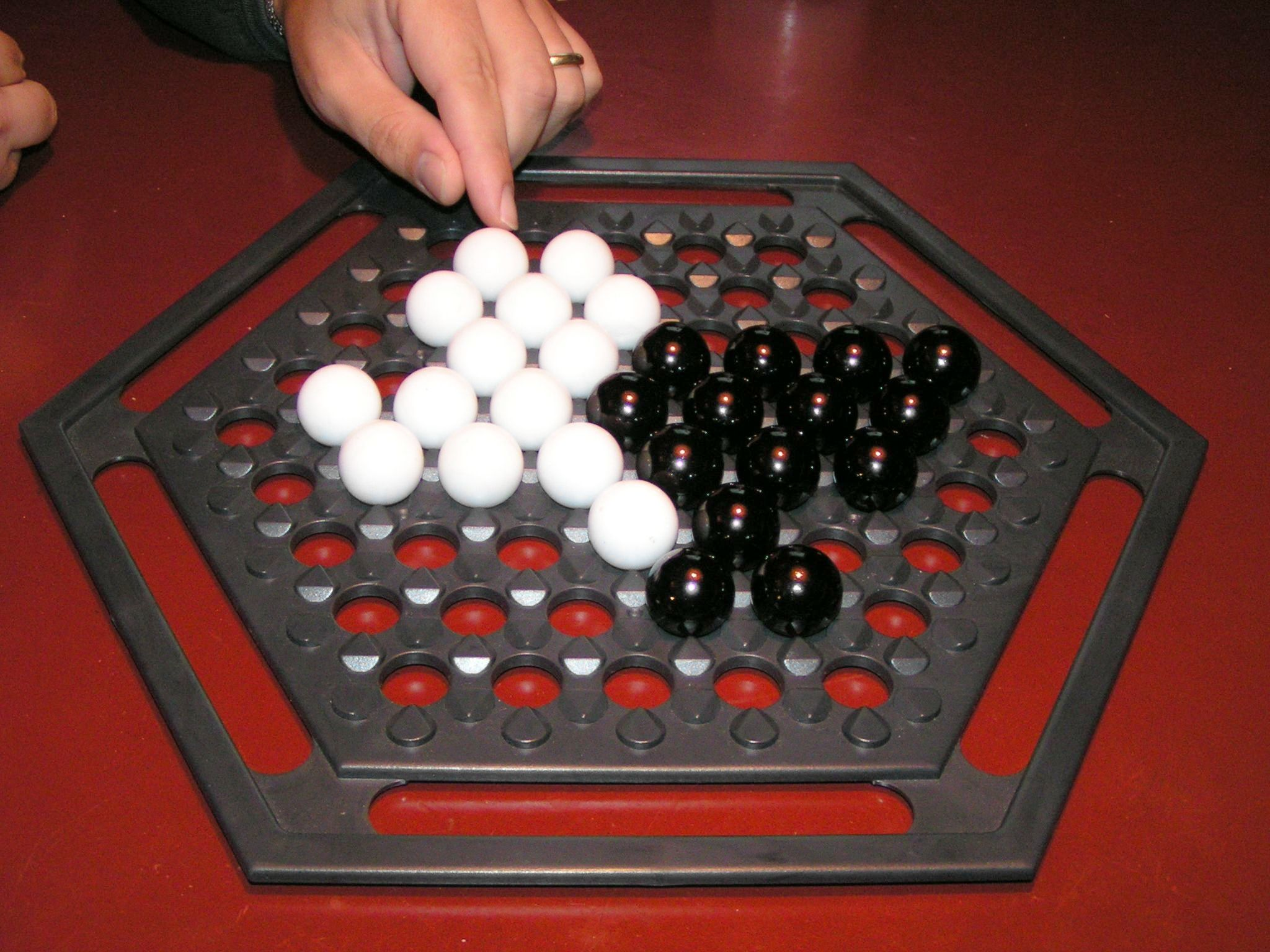
Abalone board and marbles

Abalone is a strategy game using a hexagonal patterned board with 14 marbles for each of two players. The objective is to push six of the opponent's marbles off the edge of the board.

Events held by Olympiad and year
1	2	3	4	5	6	7	8	9	10	11	12	13	14	15	16	17	18
1989	1990	1991	1992	2000	2001	2002	2003	2004	2005	2006	2007	2008	2009	2010	2011	2013	2015
							check										

Participants and results
Olympiad	Year	Number of participants	Ranking	
Olympiad	Year	Number of participants	Program	Authors
8	2003	2	1. Aba-Pro; 2. Nacre	1. Tino Werner, Austria; 2. Peer Sommerlund, Denmark

=== Amazons ===
	a	b	c	d	e	f	g	h	i	j
10	a10	b10	c10	d10 black queen	e10	f10	g10 black queen	h10	i10	j10	10
9	a9	b9	c9	d9	e9	f9	g9	h9	i9	j9	9
8	a8	b8	c8	d8	e8	f8	g8	h8	i8	j8	8
7	a7 black queen	b7	c7	d7	e7	f7	g7	h7	i7	j7 black queen	7
6	a6	b6	c6	d6	e6	f6	g6	h6	i6	j6	6
5	a5	b5	c5	d5	e5	f5	g5	h5	i5	j5	5
4	a4 white queen	b4	c4	d4	e4	f4	g4	h4	i4	j4 white queen	4
3	a3	b3	c3	d3	e3	f3	g3	h3	i3	j3	3
2	a2	b2	c2	d2	e2	f2	g2	h2	i2	j2	2
1	a1	b1	c1	d1 white queen	e1	f1	g1 white queen	h1	i1	j1	1
	a	b	c	d	e	f	g	h	i	j

The starting position in Amazons

Amazons is played on a 10×10 chessboard by two players each with four amazons (queen chess pieces). Moves are made to block squares and the winner is the last player able to move his pieces to an unblocked square.

Events held by Olympiad and year
1	2	3	4	5	6	7	8	9	10	11	12	13	14	15	16	17	18
1989	1990	1991	1992	2000	2001	2002	2003	2004	2005	2006	2007	2008	2009	2010	2011	2013	2015
				check	check	check	check	check	check		check	check	check	check	check	check	

Participants and results
Olympiad	Year	Number of participants	Ranking	
Olympiad	Year	Number of participants	Program	Authors
5	2000	6	1. 8 Queens Problem; 2. Yamazon; 3. Anky; 4. Antiope; 5. Aska; 6. Otrere	1. Johan de Koning, Netherlands; 2. Hiroshi Yamashita, Japan; 3. Patrick Hensgens, Netherlands; 4. Theo Tegos, Greece; 5. Yoichiro Kajihara, Japan; 6. Paul Utgoff, United States
6	2001	4	1. 8 Queens Problem; 2. Aska; 3. Invader; 4. Anky	1. Johan de Koning, Netherlands; 2. Yoichiro Kajihara, Japan; 3. Richard Lorentz et al., United States; 4. Patrick Hensgens, Netherlands
7	2002	6	1. Amazong; 2. 8 Queens Problem; 3. Invader; 4. Tanazon; 5. Aska; 6. Antiope	1. Jens Lieberum, Germany; 2. Johan de Koning, Netherlands; 3. Richard Lorentz et al., United States; 4. Yasushi Tanase, Japan; 5. Yoichiro Kajihara, Japan; 6. Theo Tegos, Greece
8	2003	5	1. Amazong; 2. Invader; 3. 8 Queens Problem; 4. Aska; 5. TAS	1. Jens Lieberum, Germany; 2. Richard Lorentz et al., United States; 3. Johan de Koning, Netherlands; 4. Yoichiro Kajihara, Japan; 5. Yoshinori Higashiuchi, Reijer Grimbergen, Japan/Netherlands
9	2004	2	1. 8 Queens Problem; 2. TAS	1. Johan de Koning, Netherlands; 2. Yoshinori Higashiuchi, Reijer Grimbergen, Japan/Netherlands
10	2005	3	1. 8 Queens Problem; 2. Invader; 3. TAS	1. Johan de Koning, Netherlands; 2. Richard Lorentz et al., United States; 3. Yoshinori Higashiuchi, Reijer Grimbergen, Japan/Netherlands
12	2007	2	1. 8 Queens Problem; 2. Campya	1. Johan de Koning, Netherlands; 2. Julien Kloetzer, France
13	2008	4	1. Invader; 2. 8 Queens Problem; 3. Campya; 4. BitStronger	1. Richard Lorentz et al., United States; 2. Johan de Koning, Netherlands; 3. Julien Kloetzer, France; 4. Qiao Zhi, Sun Zhen, Tao Hongru, China
14	2009	5	1. Invader; 2. 8 Queens Problem; 3. Campya; 4. BitStronger; 5. FindFire	1. Richard Lorentz et al., United States; 2. Johan de Koning, Netherlands; 3. Julien Kloetzer, France; 4. Qiao Zhi, Sun Zhen, Tao Hongru, China; 5. Xiaowei Hu, Zhang Yuting, Wen Zhang, China
15	2010	7	1. Invader; 2. 8 Queens Problem; 3. Campya; 4. FindFire; 5. Arrow 2; 6. Bit(Go); 7. Qiyi	1. Richard Lorentz et al., United States; 2. Johan de Koning, Netherlands; 3. Julien Kloetzer, France; 4. Xiaowei Hu, Zhang Yuting, Wen Zhang, China; 5. Martin Müller et al., Canada; 6. Peixing Zhan, China
16	2011	4	1. Invader; 2. 8 Queens Problem; 3. Arrow 2; 4. Fortress	1. Richard Lorentz et al., United States; 2. Johan de Koning, Netherlands; 3. Martin Müller et al., Canada; 4. Andi Zhang, China
17	2013	6	1. Invader; 2. 8 Queens Problem; 3. Long Shot; 4. Fortress; 5. Arrow 2; 6. Explorer	1. Richard Lorentz et al., United States; 2. Johan de Koning, Netherlands; 3. Marcin Malec, United States; 4. Andi Zhang, China; 5. Martin Müller et al., Canada; 6. Zhou Ke, China

=== Awari ===
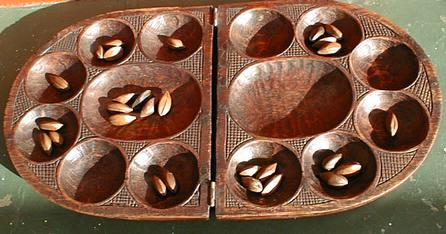
Oware game from Cameroon

Awari is an abstract strategy game among the Mancala family of board games (pit and pebble games).

Events held by Olympiad and year
1	2	3	4	5	6	7	8	9	10	11	12	13	14	15	16	17	18
1989	1990	1991	1992	2000	2001	2002	2003	2004	2005	2006	2007	2008	2009	2010	2011	2013	2015
check	check	check	check	check													

Participants and results
Olympiad	Year	Number of participants	Ranking	
Olympiad	Year	Number of participants	Program	Authors
1	1989	4	1. Marco; 2. Wali; 3. Conchos; 4. Waro	1. Rémi Niérat, France; 2. Eric van der Schilden, Netherlands; 3. Steve Thomas, United Kingdom
2	1990	2	1. Lithidion; 2. Marco	1. Victor Allis, Maarten van der Meulen, Netherlands; 2. Rémi Niérat, France
3	1991	2	1. Lithidion; 2. MyProgram	1. Victor Allis, Maarten van der Meulen, Netherlands; 2. Eric van Riet Paap, Netherlands
4	1992	3	1. Lithidion; 2. Marvin; 3. Juju	1. Victor Allis, Maarten van der Meulen, Netherlands; 2. Thomas Lincke, Switzerland
5	2000	2	1. Marvin; 2. Softwari	1. Thomas Lincke, Switzerland; 2. Roel van der Goot, Netherlands

=== Backgammon ===
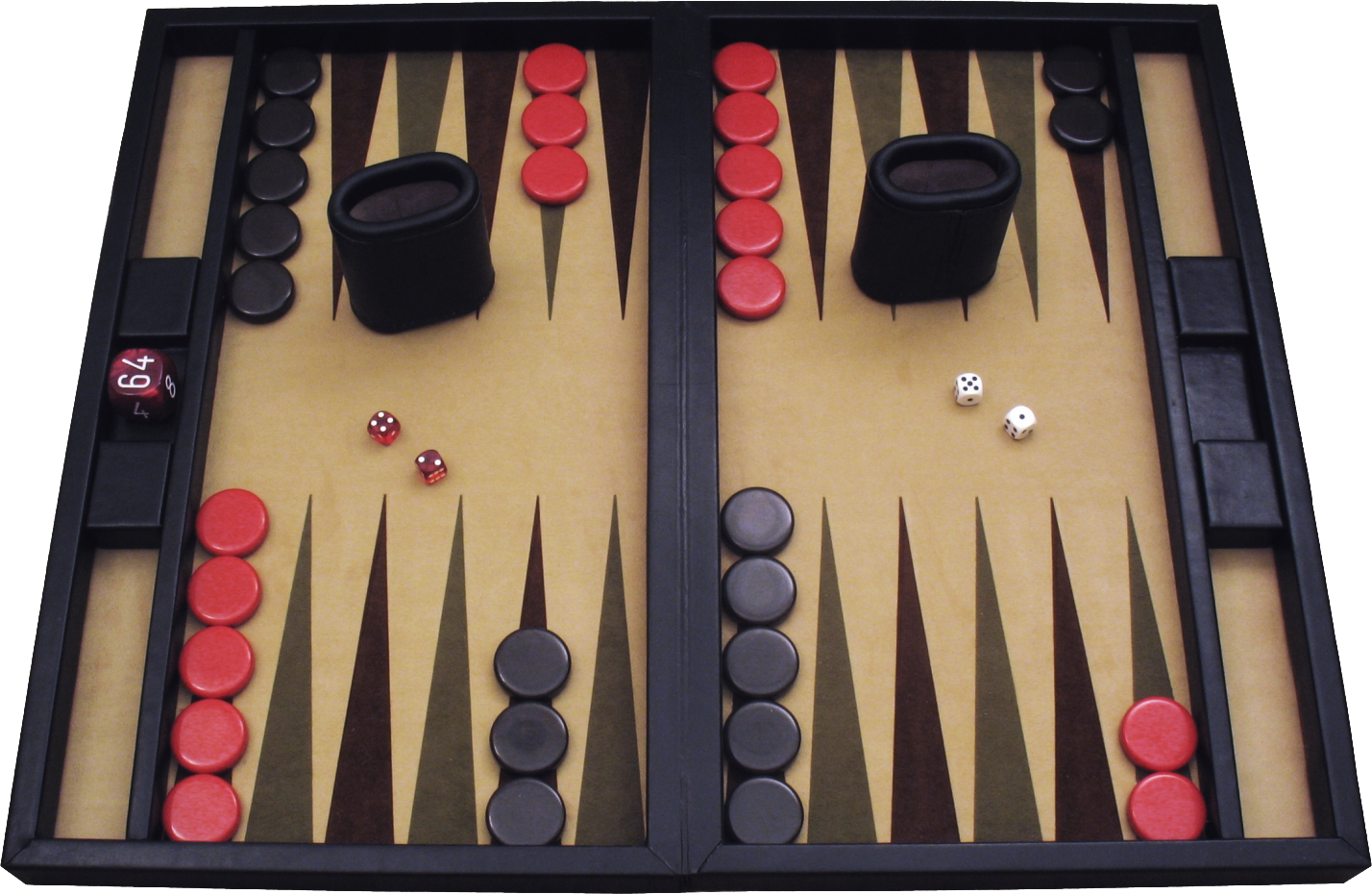
Backgammon board and checkers

Backgammon is a board game for two players where the checker-like playing pieces are moved according to the roll of dice; a player wins by removing all of his pieces from the board before his opponent.

Events held by Olympiad and year
1	2	3	4	5	6	7	8	9	10	11	12	13	14	15	16	17	18
1989	1990	1991	1992	2000	2001	2002	2003	2004	2005	2006	2007	2008	2009	2010	2011	2013	2015
check	check		check			check	check			check	check				check		check

Participants and results
Olympiad	Year	Number of participants	Ranking	
Olympiad	Year	Number of participants	Program	Authors
1	1989	6	1. Neurogammon; 2. Video Gammon; 3. Saitek Backgammon; 4. Mephisto Backgammon; 5. Backbrain; 6. A.I. Backgammon	1. Gerald Tesauro, United States; 2. Randall Hoogerhyde, United States; 3. Ossi Weiner, Netherlands
2	1990	2	1. Video Gammon; 2. Prospero	1. Randall Hoogerhyde, United States; 2. Raymond Mills, United Kingdom
4	1992	3	1. Bax; 2. Maestro; 3. Video Gammon	1. Klaus-Uwe Koschnik, Germany; 2. Justin Boyan, United States; 3. Randall Hoogerhyde, United States
7	2002	2	1. BGBlitz; 2. GNU Backgammon	1. Frank Berger, Germany; 2. Massimiliano Maini, Italy; Achim Müller, Germany
8	2003	2	1. BGBlitz; 2. GNU Backgammon	1. Frank Berger, Germany; 2. Massimiliano Maini, Italy; Achim Müller, Germany
11	2006	2	1. GNU Backgammon; 2. BGBlitz	1. Massimiliano Maini, Italy; Achim Müller, Germany; 2. Frank Berger, Germany
12	2007	3	1. BGBlitz; 2. GNU Backgammon; 3. MCgammon	1. Frank Berger, Germany; 2. Massimiliano Maini, Italy; Achim Müller, Germany; 3. Guillaume Chaslot, François van Lieshout, Belgium
16	2011	3	1. Palamedes; 2. GNU Backgammon; 3. BGBlitz	1. Nikos Papahristou, Greece; 2. Massimiliano Maini, Italy; Achim Müller, Germany; 3. Frank Berger, Germany
18	2015	3	1. GNU Backgammon; 2. BGBlitz; 3. Palamedes	1. Massimiliano Maini, Italy; Achim Müller, Germany; 2. Frank Berger, Germany; 3. Nikos Papahristou, Greece

=== Bridge ===
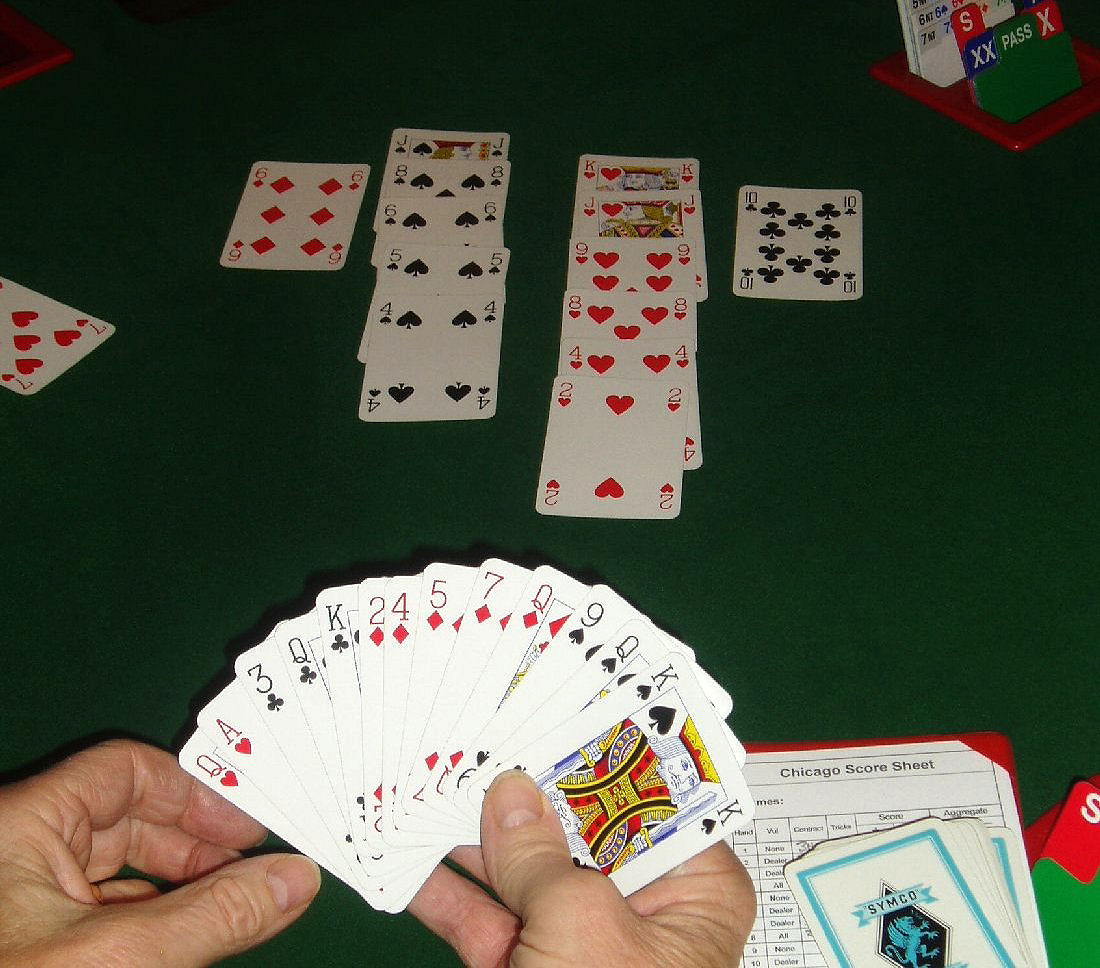
A bridge hand being played

Bridge is a trick-taking card game for four players.

Bridge participation in the Computer Olympiad was largely discontinued when in 1996 the American Contract Bridge League established a new official World Computer Bridge Championship, to be run annually at a major bridge tournament. Starting in 1999, that event is now co-sponsored by the World Bridge Federation.

Events held by Olympiad and year
1	2	3	4	5	6	7	8	9	10	11	12	13	14	15	16	17	18
1989	1990	1991	1992	2000	2001	2002	2003	2004	2005	2006	2007	2008	2009	2010	2011	2013	2015
check	check	check	check			check											

Participants and results
Olympiad	Year	Number of participants	Ranking	
Olympiad	Year	Number of participants	Program	Authors
1	1989	4	1. Acol Master; 2. Vtech; 3. Oxford Bridge; 4. Bridge Baron	1. Paul Jones, United Kingdom; 2. Tony Guilfoyle, United States; 3. Andrew Bracher, United Kingdom; 4. Tom Throop, Tony Guilfoyle, United Kingdom
2	1990	2	1. Bridge Baron; 2. Oxford Bridge	1. Tom Throop, Tony Guilfoyle, United Kingdom; 2. Andrew Bracher, United Kingdom
3	1991	3	1. Bridge Baron; 2. Pupil; 3. Bridge King	1. Tom Throop, Tony Guilfoyle, United Kingdom; 2. Joost Jacob, Netherlands; 3. Johannes Leber, Gero Scholz, Germany
4	1992	3	1. Bridge King; 2. Bridge Baron; 3. Alpha Bridge	1. Johannes Leber, Gero Scholz, Germany; 2. Tom Throop, Tony Guilfoyle, United Kingdom; 3. Alexander Lopatin, Russia
7	2002	2	1. Wbridge5; 2. Jack	1. Yves Costel, France; 2. Hans Kuijff, Netherlands

=== Chess ===
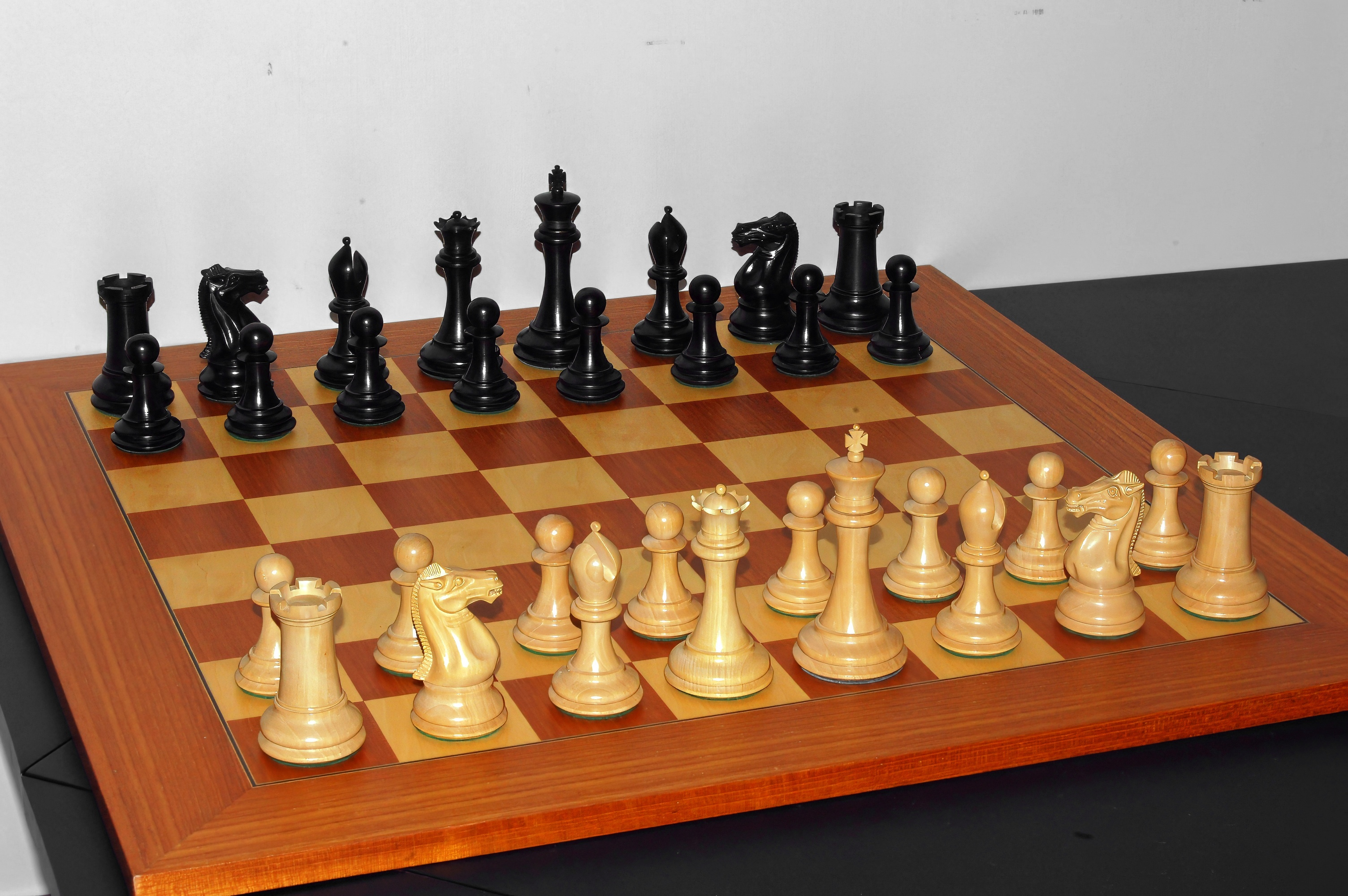
Chess board and pieces

Chess is a two-player board game played on a checkered game-board with 64 squares arranged in an eight-by-eight grid. Each player begins with 16 pieces of varying characteristics, the objective being to capture one's opponent's king piece.

Many computer-versus-computer events are held beyond those of the Computer Olympiad.

Events held by Olympiad and year
1	2	3	4	5	6	7	8	9	10	11	12	13	14	15	16	17	18
1989	1990	1991	1992	2000	2001	2002	2003	2004	2005	2006	2007	2008	2009	2010	2011	2013	2015
check	check	check	check										check				check

Participants and results
Olympiad	Year	Number of participants	Ranking	
Olympiad	Year	Number of participants	Program	Authors
1	1989	9	1. Rebel; 2. Mephisto; 3. Fidelity X 4. Pandix; 5. Chess Player 2150; 6. Hiarcs 4.1; 7. Échec 1.5; 8. E6P; 9. Woodpusher	1. Ed Schroder, Jan Louwman, Netherlands; 2. Richard Lang, United Kingdom; 3. Kathe Spracklen, Dan Spracklen, United States; 4. Gyula Horvath, Hungary; 5. Chris Whittington, United Kingdom; 6. Mark Uniacke, Harvey Williamson, Eric Hallsworth, United Kingdom; Sebastian Bohme, Germany; 7. Marc-François Baudot, Jean-Christophe Weill, France; 8. John Hamlen, United Kingdom
2	1990	11	1. Mephisto; 2. Rebel; 3. Zugzwang; 4. Kaissa; 5. Échec; 6. Woodpusher; 7. Brainstorm; 8. Chess Player 2150; 9. Hiarcs; 10. Nightmare (D); 11. Chess Guru	1. Richard Lang, United Kingdom; 2. Ed Schroder, Jan Louwman, Netherlands; 3. Rainer Feldmann, Peter Mysliwietz, Heiner Matthias, Germany; 4. Mikhail Donskoy, Vladimir Aralzarov, Alexander Ushkov, USSR; 5. Marc-François Baudot, Jean-Christophe Weill, France; 6. John Hamlen, United Kingdom; 7. Gyula Horvath, Hungary; 8. Chris Whittington, United Kingdom; 9. Mark Uniacke, Harvey Williamson, Eric Hallsworth, United Kingdom; Sebastian Bohme, Germany; 10. Reinhold Gellner, Gaby von Rekowski, Germany; 11. Joël Rivat, France
3	1991	7	1. Chessmachine WK; 2. Chessmachine King; 3. Chess Player 2175; 4. Nightmare NL; 5. Nimzo; 6. Dappet; 7. Touch	1. Ed Schroder, Netherlands; 2. Johan de Koning, Netherlands; 3. Chris Whittington, United Kingdom; 4. Joost Buijs, Netherlands; 5. Chrilly Donninger, Austria; 6. Dap Hartmann, Peter Kouwenhoven, Netherlands; 7. Jos Uiterwijk, Netherlands
4	1992	7	1. Genesis; 1. The King; 1. Hiarcs 6.72; 4. Woodpusher; 5. Duck; 6. Touch; 7. Ananse	1. Eric van Riet Paap, Netherlands; 1. Johan de Koning, Netherlands; 1. Mark Uniacke, Harvey Williamson, Eric Hallsworth, United Kingdom; Sebastian Bohme, Germany; 4. John Hamlen, United Kingdom; 5. Dennis Breuker, Netherlands; 6. Jos Uiterwijk, Netherlands; 7. Walter Bannerman, Switzerland
14	2009	6	1. Rybka (disqualified); 2. Shredder; 3. Deep Sjeng; 4. Pandix; 5. Joker; 6. Equinox	1. Vasik Rajlich, United Kingdom; 2. Stefan Meyer-Kahlen, Germany; Sandro Necchi, Italy; 3. Gian-Carlo Pascutto, Belgium; Erdogan Günes, Turkey/Germany; 4. Gyula Horváth, Hungary; 5. Harm Geert Mueller, Netherlands; 6. Gian Carlo Delli Colli, Stefano Rocchi, Italy; Harry Schnapp, Germany

=== Chinese chess ===
Chinese chess board

Chinese chess is a strategy board game for two players from the same family as western or international chess. Known primarily as Xiangqi internationally, the game is referred to as Chinese chess in the Computer Olympiad competitions.

Events held by Olympiad and year
1	2	3	4	5	6	7	8	9	10	11	12	13	14	15	16	17	18
1989	1990	1991	1992	2000	2001	2002	2003	2004	2005	2006	2007	2008	2009	2010	2011	2013	2015
check	check	check	check		check	check	check	check	check	check	check	check	check	check	check	check	

Participants and results
Olympiad	Year	Number of participants	Medalist Ranking	
Olympiad	Year	Number of participants	Program	Authors
1	1989	5	1. Acer Chinese Chess; 2. CChess Expert Acme; 3. Elephant; 4. Xian; 5. Ogre	1. Yu Shi-Shun, Taiwan; 2. Kuo-Ming Ts'ao, Taiwan; 3. Zhe-Yu Guo, Tzu-Tse Lin, Kuang-Che Wu, Wen-Jang Huang, Jen-Hsuan Li, Shih-Chieh Huang, Shun-Shii Lin, Francis Pai, Shun-Chin Hsu, Taiwan; 4. Nick Jacobs, United States; 5. United Kingdom
2	1990	3	1. Elephant; 2. CChess Expert Acme; 3. NKS	1. Zhe-Yu Guo, Tzu-Tse Lin, Kuang-Che Wu, Wen-Jang Huang, Jen-Hsuan Li, Shih-Chieh Huang, Shun-Shii Lin, Francis Pai, Shun-Chin Hsu, Taiwan; 2. Kuo-Ming Ts'ao, Taiwan; 3. Huang Shao Long, Su Zhi, China
3	1991	2	1. Surprise; 2. Abyss	1. Ren Wu, China; 2. Tony Marsland, Chun Ye, Canada
4	1992	2	1. Surprise; 2. Elephant	1. Ren Wu, China; 2. Zhe-Yu Guo, Tzu-Tse Lin, Kuang-Che Wu, Wen-Jang Huang, Jen-Hsuan Li, Shih-Chieh Huang, Shun-Shii Lin, Francis Pai, Shun-Chin Hsu, Taiwan
6	2001	3	1. ELP; 2. SG 8.2 1; 3. Abyss '99	1. Wu-Yao Cheng, Jr-Chang Chen, Shun-Chin Hsu, Taiwan; 2. Ming-Cheng Cheng, Shi-Jim Yen, Taiwan; 3. Tony Marsland, Chun Ye, Canada
7	2002	4	1. ELP; 2. Shiga 8.1; 3. XieXie; 4. Abyss '99	1. Wu-Yao Cheng, Jr-Chang Chen, Shun-Chin Hsu, Taiwan; 2. Ming-Cheng Cheng, Shi-Jim Yen, Taiwan; 3. Pascal Tang, France; Eugenio Castillo Jimenez, Spain; Jih Tung Pai; 4. Tony Marsland, Chun Ye, Canada
8	2003	5	1. ZMBL; 2. XieXie; 3. ELP; 4. Lock; 5. Contemplation	1. Zhi-Jian Tu, China; 2. Pascal Tang, France; Eugenio Castillo Jimenez, Spain; Jih Tung Pai; 3. Wu-Yao Cheng, Jr-Chang Chen, Shun-Chin Hsu, Taiwan; 4. Ming-Cheng Cheng, Shi-Jim Yen, Taiwan; 5. Kuang-Che Wu, Jr-Chang Chen, Tsan-Sheng Hsu, Shun-Chin Hsu, Taiwan
9	2004	2	1. Contemplation; 2. ELP	1. Kuang-Che Wu, Jr-Chang Chen, Tsan-Sheng Hsu, Shun-Chin Hsu, Taiwan; 2. Wu-Yao Cheng, Jr-Chang Chen, Shun-Chin Hsu, Taiwan
10	2005	14	1. XQMASTER; 2. Shiga; 3. NEUChess; 4. TMSK; 5. Contemplation; 6. XieXie; 7. ELP; 8. Yuan-Chi; 9. Yan-Chi Wu; 10. Deep Elephant; 11. Elephant Eye; 12. Chimo; 13. ShinGi; 14. Jade	1. Ming-Yang Zhao, China; 2. Ming-Cheng Cheng, Shi-Jim Yen, Taiwan; 3. Jiao Wang, China; 4. Bing-Jie Shen, Ruei-Ping Li, Tsan-Sheng Hsu, Taiwan; 5. Kuang-Che Wu, Jr-Chang Chen, Tsan-Sheng Hsu, Shun-Chin Hsu, Taiwan; 6. Pascal Tang, France; Eugenio Castillo Jimenez, Spain; Jih Tung Pai; 7. Wu-Yao Cheng, Jr-Chang Chen, Shun-Chin Hsu, Taiwan; 8. Shih-Kuang Huang, Taiwan; 9. Yan-Chi Wu, Taiwan; 10. Zhe-Yu Guo, Tzu-Tse Lin, Kuang-Che Wu, Wen-Jang Huang, Jen-Hsuan Li, Shih-Chieh Huang, Shun-Shii Lin, Francis Pai, Shun-Chin Hsu, Taiwan; 11. Huang Chen, China; 12. Wen-Jie Tseng, Wei-Lun Kao, Hung-Hsuan Lin, Chun-Bin Hsu, I-Chen Wu, Shun-Chin Hsu, Taiwan; 13. Larry Tu, United States; 14. Ting-Wei Hou, Taiwan
11	2006	5	1. NEUChess; 2. Shiga; 3. Deep Elephant; 4. XieXie; 5. Contemplation	1. Jiao Wang, China; 2. Ming-Cheng Cheng, Shi-Jim Yen, Taiwan; 3. Zhe-Yu Guo, Tzu-Tse Lin, Kuang-Che Wu, Wen-Jang Huang, Jen-Hsuan Li, Shih-Chieh Huang, Shun-Shii Lin, Francis Pai, Shun-Chin Hsu, Taiwan; 4. Pascal Tang, France;Eugenio Castillo Jimenez, Spain; Jih Tung Pai; 5. Kuang-Che Wu, Jr-Chang Chen, Tsan-Sheng Hsu, Shun-Chin Hsu, Taiwan
12	2007	5	1. NEUChess; 2. Shiga; 3. XieXie; 4. Deep Elephant; 5. Chimo	1. Jiao Wang, China; 2. Ming-Cheng Cheng, Shi-Jim Yen, Taiwan; 3. Pascal Tang, France; Eugenio Castillo Jimenez, Spain; Jih Tung Pai; 4. Zhe-Yu Guo, Tzu-Tse Lin, Kuang-Che Wu, Wen-Jang Huang, Jen-Hsuan Li, Shih-Chieh Huang, Shun-Shii Lin, Francis Pai, Shun-Chin Hsu, Taiwan; 5. Wen-Jie Tseng, Wei-Lun Kao, Hung-Hsuan Lin, Chun-Bin Hsu, I-Chen Wu, Shun-Chin Hsu, Taiwan
13	2008	18	1. Intella; 2. Cyclone; 3. EThinker; 4. Gaga chess 5. MonkeyKing; 6. NEUChess; 7. 3DChess; 8. XQMASTER; 9. TMSK; 10. YSSY; 11. Shiga; 12. Binghewusi; 13. UFX; 14. OracleX; 15. ABCCHESS; 16. Multi-stars of SJTU; 17. Chimo; 18. QiJi	1. Chaoying Chen, Yutao Wei, China; 2. Min Zhang, China; 3. Zheng Xu, China; 4. Guolai Li, China; 5. Xinhe Xu, China; 6. Jiao Wang, China; 7. Liu Jin, China; 8. Ming-Yang Zhao, China; 9. Bing-Jie Shen, Ruei-Ping Li, Tsan-Sheng Hsu, Taiwan; 10. Zhang Hao, China; 11. Ming-Cheng Cheng, Shi-Jim Yen, Taiwan; 12. Fan DeJun, China; 13. Liu Kai, China; 14. Zhifu Zhang, Canada; 15. Liang Jian Hua, China; 16. Zhijun Li, Qi Zhengwei, China; 17. Wen-Jie Tseng, Wei-Lun Kao, Hung-Hsuan Lin, Chun-Bin Hsu, I-Chen Wu, Shun-Chin Hsu, Taiwan; 18. Duan Yong, Li Zhengqing, Liu Cuiwei, China
14	2009	5	1. TMSK; 2. HaQiKi D 3. Chimo; 4. Contemplation; 5. ELP	1. Bing-Jie Shen, Ruei-Ping Li, Tsan-Sheng Hsu, Taiwan; 2. Harm Geert Mueller, Netherlands; 3. Wen-Jie Tseng, Wei-Lun Kao, Hung-Hsuan Lin, Chun-Bin Hsu, I-Chen Wu, Shun-Chin Hsu, Taiwan; 4. Kuang-Che Wu, Jr-Chang Chen, Tsan-Sheng Hsu, Shun-Chin Hsu, Taiwan; 5. Wu-Yao Cheng, Jr-Chang Chen, Shun-Chin Hsu, Taiwan
15	2010	5	1. Shiga; 2. TMSK; 3. Chimo; 4. HaQiKi D 5. SunRise	1. Ming-Cheng Cheng, Shi-Jim Yen, Taiwan; 2. Bing-Jie Shen, Ruei-Ping Li, Tsan-Sheng Hsu, Taiwan; 3. Wen-Jie Tseng, Wei-Lun Kao, Hung-Hsuan Lin, Chun-Bin Hsu, I-Chen Wu, Shun-Chin Hsu, Taiwan; 4. Harm Geert Mueller, Netherlands; 5. Hao Cui, Jiajia Guo, Xiaowei Hu, Zhao Jianbo, Xiaomeng Yang
16	2011	3	1. Shiga; 2. Chimo; 3. HaQiKi D	1. Ming-Cheng Cheng, Shi-Jim Yen, Taiwan; 2. Wen-Jie Tseng, Wei-Lun Kao, Hung-Hsuan Lin, Chun-Bin Hsu, I-Chen Wu, Shun-Chin Hsu, Taiwan; 3. Harm Geert Mueller, Netherlands
17	2013	4	1. Chimo; 2. HaQiKi D 3. Shimanese; 4. Shiga	1. Wen-Jie Tseng, Wei-Lun Kao, Hung-Hsuan Lin, Chun-Bin Hsu, I-Chen Wu, Shun-Chin Hsu, Taiwan; 2. Harm Geert Mueller, Netherlands; 3. Tsuyoshi Hashimoto, Masahiko Yoshida, Japan; 4. Ming-Cheng Cheng, Shi-Jim Yen, Taiwan

=== Chinese dark chess ===
Chinese dark chess is known as Banqi in Chinese.

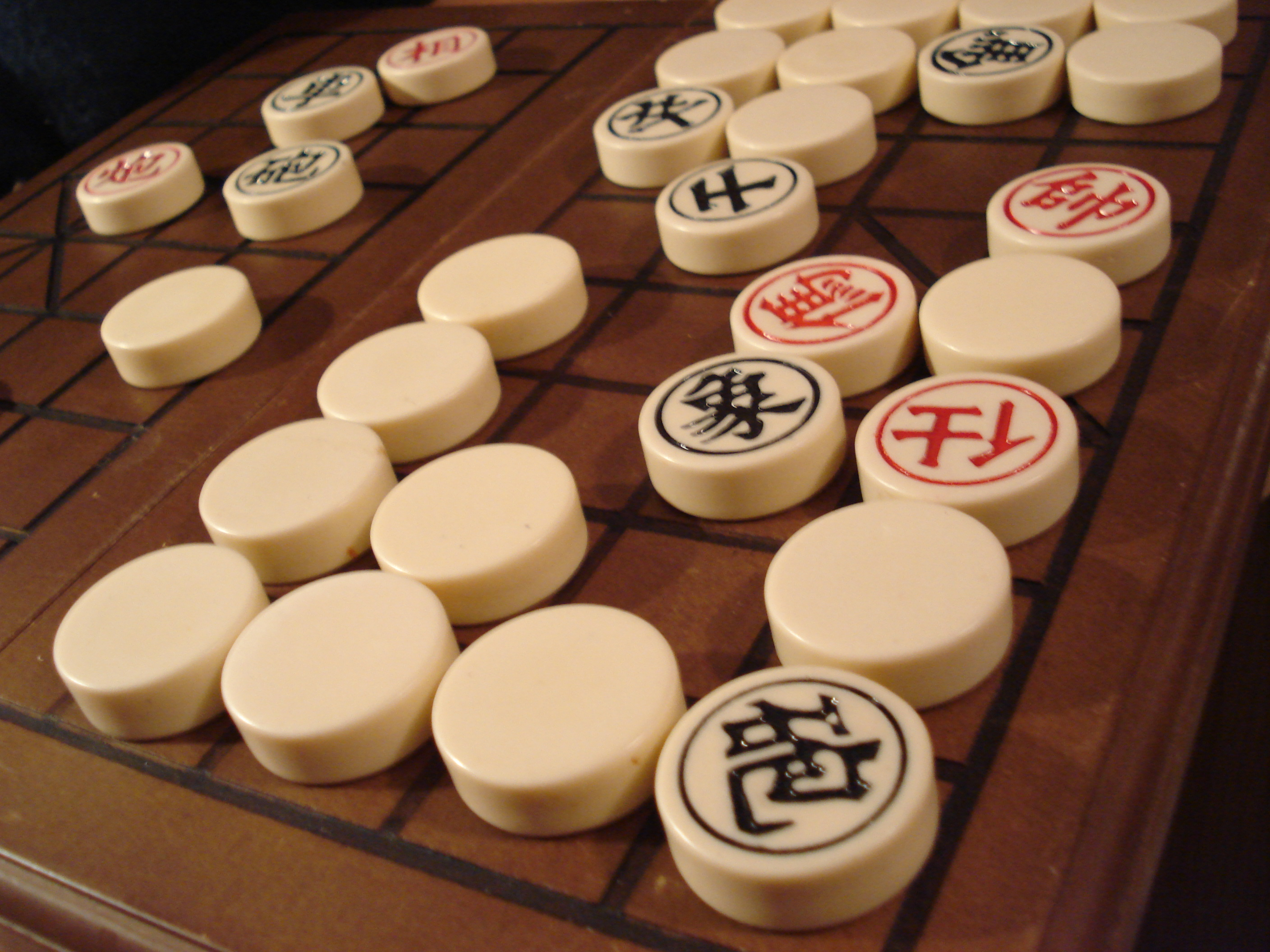
Chinese dark chess (banqi) board and pieces

Events held by Olympiad and year
1	2	3	4	5	6	7	8	9	10	11	12	13	14	15	16	17	18
1989	1990	1991	1992	2000	2001	2002	2003	2004	2005	2006	2007	2008	2009	2010	2011	2013	2015
														check		check	check

=== Clobber ===
a10 white circle	b10 black circle	c10 white circle	d10 black circle	e10 white circle	f10 black circle	g10 white circle	h10 black circle	i10 white circle	j10 black circle
a9 black circle	b9 white circle	c9 black circle	d9 white circle	e9 black circle	f9 white circle	g9 black circle	h9 white circle	i9 black circle	j9 white circle
a8 white circle	b8 black circle	c8 white circle	d8 black circle	e8 white circle	f8 black circle	g8 white circle	h8 black circle	i8 white circle	j8 black circle
a7 black circle	b7 white circle	c7 black circle	d7 white circle	e7 black circle	f7 white circle	g7 black circle	h7 white circle	i7 black circle	j7 white circle
a6 white circle	b6 black circle	c6 white circle	d6 black circle	e6 white circle	f6 black circle	g6 white circle	h6 black circle	i6 white circle	j6 black circle
a5 black circle	b5 white circle	c5 black circle	d5 white circle	e5 black circle	f5 white circle	g5 black circle	h5 white circle	i5 black circle	j5 white circle
a4 white circle	b4 black circle	c4 white circle	d4 black circle	e4 white circle	f4 black circle	g4 white circle	h4 black circle	i4 white circle	j4 black circle
a3 black circle	b3 white circle	c3 black circle	d3 white circle	e3 black circle	f3 white circle	g3 black circle	h3 white circle	i3 black circle	j3 white circle
a2 white circle	b2 black circle	c2 white circle	d2 black circle	e2 white circle	f2 black circle	g2 white circle	h2 black circle	i2 white circle	j2 black circle
a1 black circle	b1 white circle	c1 black circle	d1 white circle	e1 black circle	f1 white circle	g1 black circle	h1 white circle	i1 black circle	j1 white circle

While standard Clobber is played on a 5x6 board, computer Clobber is usually played on a 10x10 board.

Events held by Olympiad and year
1	2	3	4	5	6	7	8	9	10	11	12	13	14	15	16	17	18
1989	1990	1991	1992	2000	2001	2002	2003	2004	2005	2006	2007	2008	2009	2010	2011	2013	2015
									check	check				check	check	check	check

=== Connect Four ===
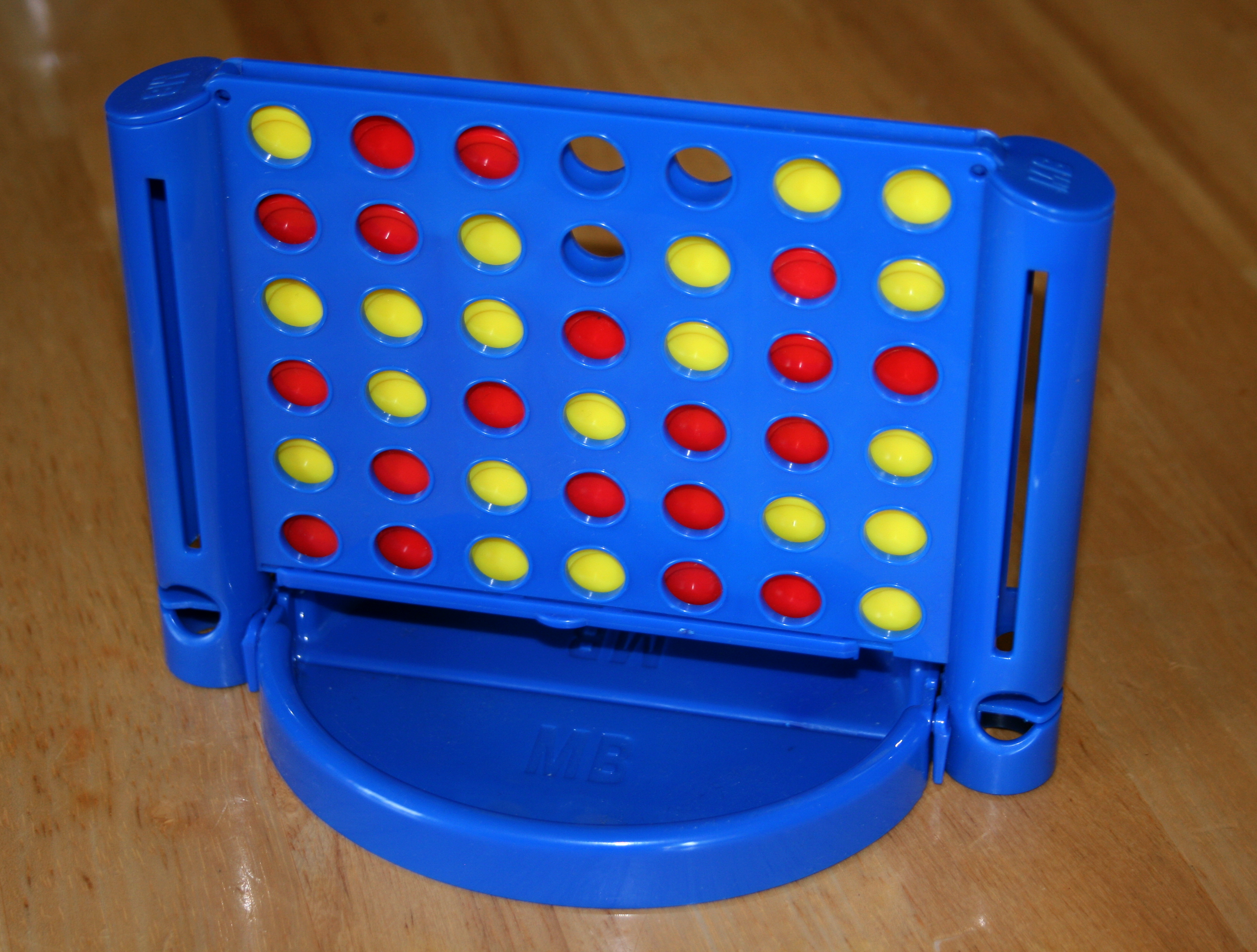
Connect Four travel version by Milton Bradley

Events held by Olympiad and year
1	2	3	4	5	6	7	8	9	10	11	12	13	14	15	16	17	18
1989	1990	1991	1992	2000	2001	2002	2003	2004	2005	2006	2007	2008	2009	2010	2011	2013	2015
check																	

=== Connect6 ===
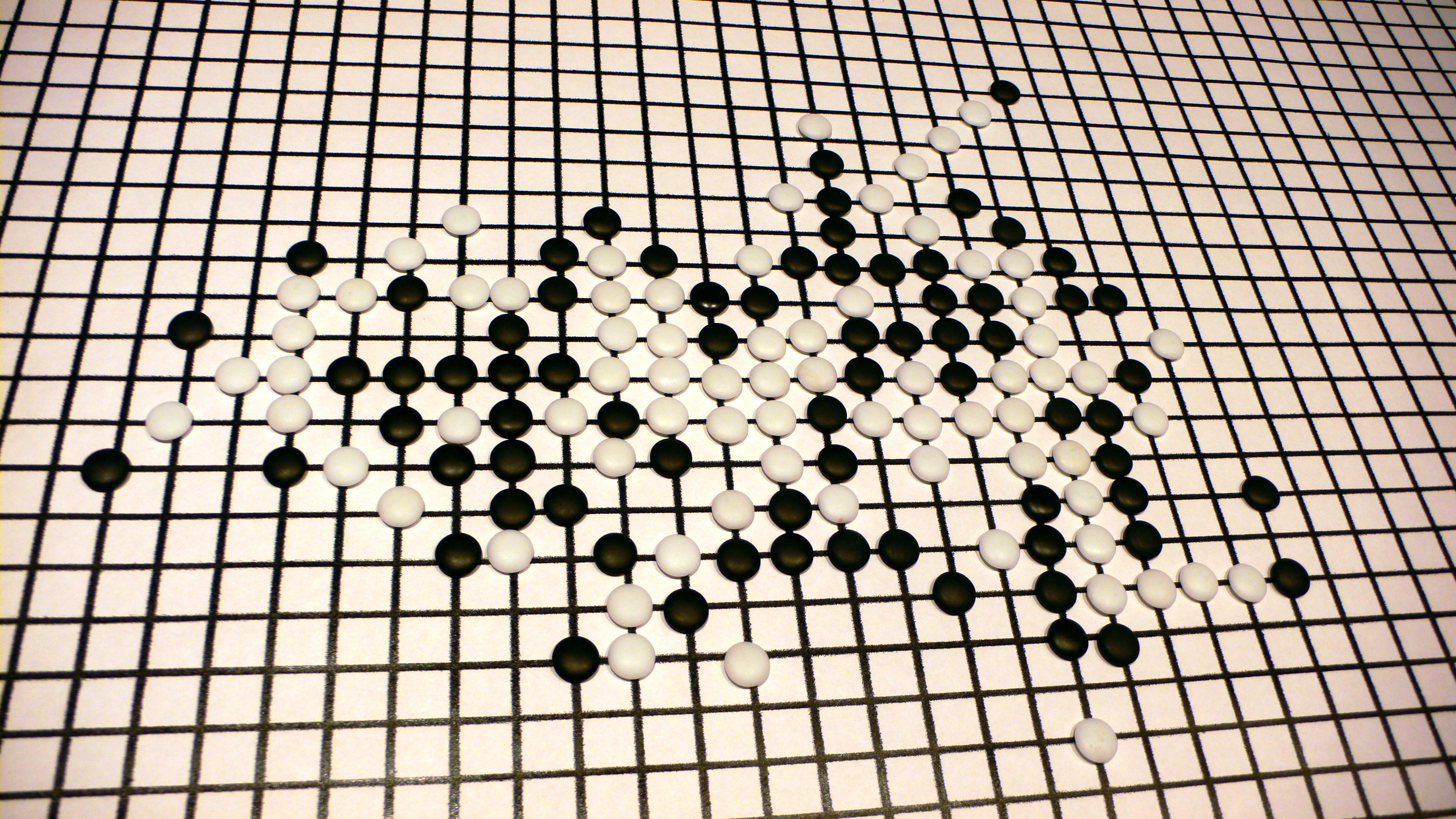
Connect6 board and pieces

Events held by Olympiad and year
1	2	3	4	5	6	7	8	9	10	11	12	13	14	15	16	17	18
1989	1990	1991	1992	2000	2001	2002	2003	2004	2005	2006	2007	2008	2009	2010	2011	2013	2015
										check	check	check	check	check	check	check	check

=== Dominoes ===
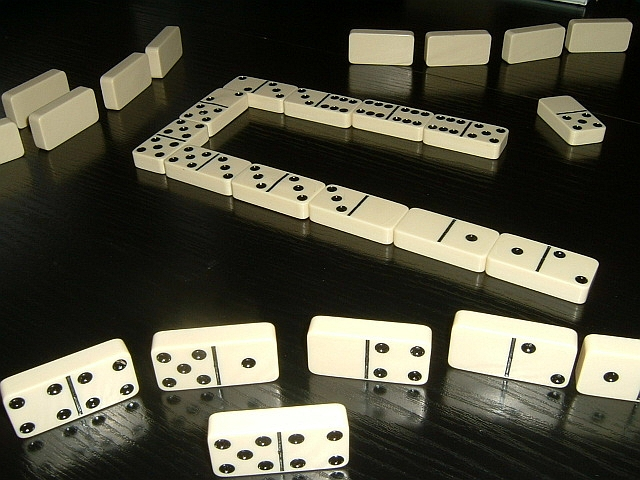
Domino pieces – played and unplayed

Events held by Olympiad and year
1	2	3	4	5	6	7	8	9	10	11	12	13	14	15	16	17	18
1989	1990	1991	1992	2000	2001	2002	2003	2004	2005	2006	2007	2008	2009	2010	2011	2013	2015
check																	

=== Gin rummy ===
Events held by Olympiad and year
1	2	3	4	5	6	7	8	9	10	11	12	13	14	15	16	17	18
1989	1990	1991	1992	2000	2001	2002	2003	2004	2005	2006	2007	2008	2009	2010	2011	2013	2015
			check														

Participants and results
Olympiad	Year	Number of participants	Ranking	
Olympiad	Year	Number of participants	Program	Authors
4	1992	2	1. Rummymate; 2. Ginrummy	

=== GIPF ===
GIPF
Olympiad	Year	Number of participants	Ranking	
Olympiad	Year	Number of participants	Program	Authors
6	2001	2	1. GF1; 2. Gipfted	1. Kurt Van den Branden, Belgium; 2. Diederik Wentink, Netherlands

=== Octi ===
Octi is an abstract strategy game designed by Donald Green, with similarities to checkers and chess but allowing for multiple jumping, capturing, and special movement of pieces. The object of the game is to move one's pieces into the opponent's starting points.

Octi
Olympiad	Year	Number of participants	Ranking	
Olympiad	Year	Number of participants	Program	Authors
9	2004	2	1. Casbah; 2. Testme2	1. Charles Sutton, United States; 2. Jeff Bacher, Canada

=== Poker ===
Poker
Olympiad	Year	Number of participants	Ranking	
Olympiad	Year	Number of participants	Program	Authors
8	2003	2	1. Sparbot; 2. Vexbot	1. Neil Burch, Canada; 2. Terence Schauenberg, Canada

=== Pool ===
Also known as computational pool.

Events held by Olympiad and year
1	2	3	4	5	6	7	8	9	10	11	12	13	14	15	16	17	18
1989	1990	1991	1992	2000	2001	2002	2003	2004	2005	2006	2007	2008	2009	2010	2011	2013	2015
									check	check		check					

Participants and results
Olympiad	Year	Number of participants	Ranking	
Olympiad	Year	Number of participants	Program	Authors
10	2005	4	1. UofA; 2. PoolMaster; 3. Elix; 4. SkyNet	
11	2006	5	1. PickPocket; 2. SkyNet; 3. Elix; 4. PoolMaster; 5. Snooze	
13	2008	4	1. CueCard; 2. PickPocket; 3. Elix; 4. SkyNet	

== See also ==
- Computer bridge
- Computer chess
