= BAPC =

Benelux Algorithm Programming Contest (BAPC) is a programming contest for students from Belgium, the Netherlands, and Luxembourg. It is organized annually by an institution of higher education. From 1991 through 2004, the contest was held under the name NKP (Dutch Programming Championship).

== Organisation ==
Since 2006, BAPC is an official preliminary of NWERC (Northwestern Europe Regional Contest). In practice, this means the participating institutions determine which teams they will send to NWERC based on the results at BAPC. The top teams of NWERC (typically the top two or the top three), are invited to take part in the International Collegiate Programming Contest.

A month before BAPC, a preliminary round is held to determine which teams are allowed to represent their institution at BAPC.

Besides the student ranking, there is a ranking for companies. However, the contest is the same for all participants.

== Contest format ==
A team consists of, at most, three people and has five hours to solve a set of six to ten problems. During the contest, each team is only allowed to use a single computer. The problems are algorithmic in nature and of varying degree of difficulty.

=== Judging ===
Solutions to a problem, in the form of computer programs, can be submitted more than once. The BAPC jury checks whether a submission satisfies certain criteria and replies with a simple verdict. In case the submitted program gives the correct answer to all predefined tests within the allotted time, the response will be Accepted or Correct.

If a program requires too much time to pass all tests, the jury will reply Time Limit Exceeded. If it terminates with an error, the response will be Runtime Error, and if the program terminates correctly, but doesn't pass all tests, the reply will be Wrong Answer or Incorrect. Under no circumstances will the jury give hints as to what caused the error, which tests failed, or where the Bug is.

=== Scoring ===
For each solved problem, one point is awarded. For each point scored within the first four hours of the contest, a helium balloon is attached to the team's computer. After four hours, the scoreboard is no longer updated, so that it remains a secret who won until the award ceremony.

Ties are solved by a time penalty (the lower, the better). Every team starts out with a penalty time of 0 minutes. For every solved problem, the time from the start of the contest until the correct submission in minutes is added to the time penalty. For every prior wrong submission for a solved problem, 20 minutes are added. Wrong submissions for problems that are not eventually solved do not affect the a team's score.

=== Prizes ===
The prizes for the top three teams are typically a power of two. In 2008, for example, the prizes for the first, second, and third student teams were 1024, 512, and 256 euro respectively. The best company team received 512 euro. Participation costs for companies were 500 euro per team, while participation for student teams was free.

== History ==
Year	Organizer	Winner	Team members	Institution
2022	TU Eindhoven	Segfault go BRRRR		Delft University of Technology
2021	VU Amsterdam	Hermannstadt Sibiu		Delft University of Technology
2020	Delft University of Technology (Online contest)	while (false) break;		Universiteit Utrecht
2019	Radboud University Nijmegen	git merge -s octopus solution cup		Leiden University
2018	Université catholique de Louvain	Mostly Harmless Bogosort		Université catholique de Louvain
2017	University of Amsterdam	Unproved Convexity Lemma		Université catholique de Louvain
2016	TU Delft	🐢➕🐇	Mattéo Couplet, Victor Lecomte and Simon Tihon	Université catholique de Louvain
2015	Universiteit Leiden	That empty teamname	Thijs Miedema, Bas Nieuwenhuizen and David Venhoek	Radboud Universiteit Nijmegen
2014	TU Eindhoven	Syntax Error	Bas Nieuwenhuizen, Mathijs van de Nes and Niels ten Dijke	Universiteit Leiden
2013	Universiteit Utrecht	Geen Syntax	Raymond van Bommel, Mathijs van de Nes and Bas Nieuwenhuizen	Universiteit Leiden
2012	Universiteit Utrecht	team5	Jan Elffers	TU Delft
2011	TU Eindhoven	Geen Commentaar	Raymond van Bommel, Josse van Dobben de Bruyn and Erik Massop	Universiteit Leiden
2010	Universiteit Leiden	Joy	Pieter Bootsma, Bauke Conijn and Thijs Marinussen	TU Eindhoven
2009	Rijksuniversiteit Groningen	Doeke en Jelle	Jelle van den Hooff and Doeke de Wolf	Universiteit van Amsterdam
2008	TU Delft	Prime Suspects	Thomas Beuman, Johan de Ruiter and Misha Stassen	Universiteit Leiden
2007	Universiteit Twente	Prime Suspects	Thomas Beuman, Johan de Ruiter and Misha Stassen	Universiteit Leiden
2006	Universiteit Leiden	Messed Up	Erik-Jan Krijgsman and Boris de Wilde	Universiteit Twente
2005	TU Delft	Messed Up	Kamiel Cornelissen, Erik-Jan Krijgsman and Boris de Wilde	Universiteit Twente
2004	Universiteit Utrecht	Klasse	Bram Fokke and Erik Tillema	Universiteit Utrecht
2003	Universiteit Twente	Makkelijk zat...	Jaap Eldering, Jan Kuipers and Wouter Waalewijn	Universiteit Utrecht
2002	Vrije Universiteit Amsterdam	Bug Fiction	Teun Koeman, Mathijs Vogelzang and Phebo Wibbens	Rijksuniversiteit Groningen
2001	TU Delft	Makkelijk zat...	Jaap Eldering, Jan Kuipers and Wouter Waalewijn	Universiteit Utrecht
2000	Rijksuniversiteit Groningen	Bug Fiction	Teun Koeman, Mathijs Vogelzang and Phebo Wibbens	Rijksuniversiteit Groningen
1999	no NKP			
1998	Universiteit Twente	The Wizards of DOZ	Daniël Mantione, Joris van Rantwijk and Roland Stoker	TU Delft
1997	Rijksuniversiteit Groningen	*scratch*	Ernst Jan Plugge, Wouter Teepe and Roel Vandewall	Rijksuniversiteit Groningen
1996	TU Eindhoven	Without Limits		Vrije Universiteit Amsterdam
1995	Universiteit Twente	m38c	Rutger Nijlunsing, Kristian Helmholt and Kero van Gelder	Rijksuniversiteit Groningen
1994	University of Amsterdam		Michel Oey, Edo Poll and Sjoerd Schreuder	Vrije Universiteit Amsterdam
1993	TU Delft		Gert Beukema, Gerton Lunter and Marco Vervoort	RUG + UvA
1992	Radboud Universiteit Nijmegen		Gerton Lunter and Marco Vervoort (and ?)	RUG + UvA
1991	Rijksuniversiteit Leiden	RUL	Patrick Min, Frank van der Neut and Rudy van Vliet	Rijksuniversiteit Leiden

In 1997, the company team Bolesian (Victor Allis, Seppo Pieterse, and Paul-Erik Raué) defeated all student teams and was crowned Dutch Champion.
In 1998, the company team Quintiq (Victor Allis, Seppo Pieterse and Paul-Erik Raué) defeated all student teams, but the best student team was declared the official winner.
In 2020, the contest was held online due to governmental regulations regarding the COVID-19 pandemic
