= Andra Gillespie =

- Gillespie in 2016
- Born: 1977 or 1978 (age 48–49)
- Education: University of Virginia; Yale University
- Scientific career
- Fields: Political science
- Workplaces: Emory University
- Doctoral advisor: Donald Green

Andra Nicole Gillespie (born 1977 or 1978) is an American political scientist who researches racial and ethnic politics in the United States, post-civil rights African American leadership, and interethnic political competition. She is an associate professor of political science at Emory University. Gillespie has authored books on Black political leadership.

== Early life and education ==
Gillespie was born in 1977 or 1978. In 1999 at University of Virginia, she earned a B.A. with honors in government and foreign affairs and African American studies, with a minor in history, and was elected to Phi Beta Kappa.

At Yale Graduate School of Arts and Sciences, she completed a M.A. in African American studies and political science in 2001, a M.Phil. in political science in 2002 and a Ph.D. in political science in 2005. Her dissertation was titled "Community, Coordination and Context: A Black Politics Perspective on Voter Mobilization." Donald Green was her doctoral advisor.

== Career ==
From June 2004 to August 2005, Gillespie was a polling analyst with the Mellman Group, a Democratic firm in Washington, D.C.. Her research interests include racial and ethnic politics in the United States, post-civil rights African American leadership, political participation, and interethnic political competition.

Gillespie began her faculty career at Emory University as an assistant professor of political science from 2005 to 2011. From 2009 to 2010, she held a partial residence Ford Foundation diversity post-doctoral fellowship at Princeton University's Center for African American studies. From 2011 to 2012, Gillespie was the Martin Luther King visiting associate professor in the department of political science at Massachusetts Institute of Technology.

Gillespie was promoted to associate professor at Emory in 2011, later adding associated faculty status in the department of African American studies in 2013 and graduate faculty status in the department of sociology in 2017. She served as interim chair of the department of African American studies from 2014 to 2015 and has been director of the James Weldon Johnson Institute for the Study of Race and Difference at Emory University since January 2015. She has authored books on Black political leadership.

== Selected works ==
- Gillespie, Andra (2009). Whose Black Politics?: Cases in Post-Racial Black Leadership. Routledge. ISBN 978-0-415-99216-9
- Gillespie, Andra (2012). The New Black Politician: Cory Booker, Newark, and Post-Racial America. NYU Press. ISBN 978-0-8147-3869-6.
- Gillespie, Andra (2019). Race and the Obama Administration: Substance, Symbols, and Hope. Manchester University Press. ISBN 978-1-5261-0503-5.
- Gillespie, Andra; Nunnally, Shayla (2023). Introduction to African American Politics. Taylor & Francis Group. ISBN 978-0-415-84360-7.
