= Michael H. Albert =

Canadian mathematician

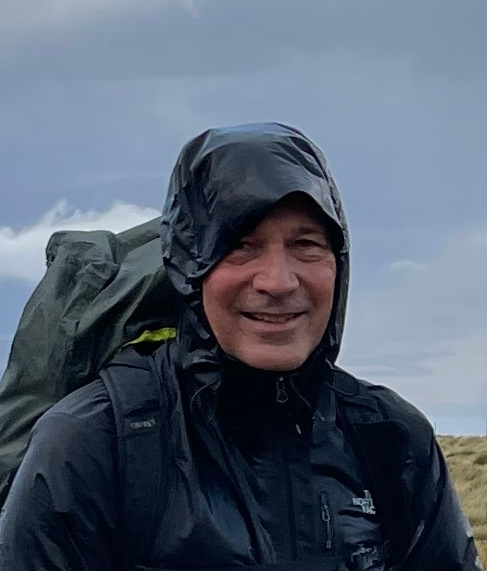
- Michael H. Albert in 2023
- Education: University of Waterloo, University of Oxford
- Known for: Permutation patterns, Combinatorial game theory, Clobber
- Scientific career
- Fields: Mathematics, Computer science
- Workplaces: University of Otago, Carnegie Mellon University, University of Waterloo
- Thesis: Topics on Continuous Lattices, z-Complete, and z-Continuous Categories (1984)
- Doctoral advisor: Hilary Priestley

Michael Henry Albert (born September 20, 1962) is a mathematician and computer scientist, originally from Canada. He is an emeritus professor in the School of Computing at the University of Otago in Dunedin, New Zealand. His varied research interests include combinatorics and combinatorial game theory.

== Education and career ==
Albert grew up in Canada, where he had success in the country's mathematics competition circuit, which he credits with developing his problem-solving skills.

He received his B.Math in 1981 from the University of Waterloo. In that year Albert received the Rhodes Scholarship, and he completed his D. Phil. in 1984 at the University of Oxford under the supervision of Hilary Priestley. His thesis was in category theory. He then returned to the University of Waterloo as a postdoc and assistant professor. From 1987 to 1996 he was an assistant and then associate professor at Carnegie Mellon University. He moved to Dunedin in 1996 and joined the University of Otago, initially in the Department of Mathematics and Statistics before transferring to the Department of Computer Science, where he served as Head of Department for seven years. In 2023, the department was amalgamated into the new School of Computing. Albert retired in December 2024 as Emeritus Professor, after 27 years of teaching and research at Otago. He has also been involved in training high school students for the International Mathematical Olympiad.

== Research ==
Albert was introduced to permutation patterns by Mike Atkinson after joining the Computer Science department at Otago, and this became a major focus of his research. In 2003, he and Atkinson co-founded the Permutation Patterns conference, which has since become the primary annual meeting in the field.

A paper with Atkinson, "Simple permutations and pattern restricted permutations" (2005), demonstrated the use of the substitution decomposition in the context of permutation patterns, providing a general strategy for the enumeration of pattern-restricted permutations based on understanding the simple permutations in a class. He also developed the "insertion encoding" (with Nik Ruškuc and Steve Linton) for representing permutations, enabling techniques from automata theory and formal languages to be applied to their enumeration and classification.

Albert developed PermLab, a software tool for working with permutation patterns.

He is a co-editor-in-chief of the Australasian Journal of Combinatorics.

=== Combinatorial games ===
Together with J.P. Grossman and Richard Nowakowski, Albert invented the game Clobber. Albert got to know Nowakowski through the Mathematical Olympiad and became interested in combinatorial game theory through that connection. Albert has also contributed to the Combinatorial Game Suite game analysis software, and is a coauthor of Lessons in Play: An Introduction to Combinatorial Game Theory.

== See also ==
- List of University of Waterloo people
