= Clobber =

Abstract strategy game

a6 white circle	b6 black circle	c6 white circle	d6 black circle	e6 white circle
a5 black circle	b5 white circle	c5 black circle	d5 white circle	e5 black circle
a4 white circle	b4 black circle	c4 white circle	d4 black circle	e4 white circle
a3 black circle	b3 white circle	c3 black circle	d3 white circle	e3 black circle
a2 white circle	b2 black circle	c2 white circle	d2 black circle	e2 white circle
a1 black circle	b1 white circle	c1 black circle	d1 white circle	e1 black circle

Starting position for 5×6 Clobber

Clobber is an abstract strategy game invented in 2001 by combinatorial game theorists Michael H. Albert, J.P. Grossman and Richard Nowakowski. It has subsequently been studied by Elwyn Berlekamp and Erik Demaine among others. Since 2005, it has been one of the events in the Computer Olympiad.

== Details ==
Clobber is best played with two players and takes an average of 15 minutes to play. It is suggested for ages 8 and up. It is typically played on a rectangular white and black checkerboard. Players take turns to move one of their own pieces onto an orthogonally adjacent opposing piece, removing it from the game. The winner of the game is the player who makes the last move (i.e. whose opponent cannot move).

To start the game, each of the squares on the checkerboard is occupied by a stone. White stones are placed on the white squares and black stones on the black squares. To move, the player must pick up one of his or her own stones and "clobber" an opponent's stone on an adjacent square, either horizontally or vertically. Once the opponent's stone is clobbered, it must then be removed from the board and replaced by the stone that was moved. The player who, on their turn, is unable to move, loses the game.

== Variants ==
In computational play (e.g., Computer Olympiad), clobber is generally played on a 10x10 board. There are also variations in the initial layout of the pieces. Another variant is Cannibal Clobber, where a stone may not only capture stones of the opponent but also other stones of its owner. An advantage of Cannibal Clobber over Clobber is that a player may not only win, but win by a non-trivial margin. Cannibal Clobber was proposed in the summer of 2003 by Ingo Althoefer. Another variant, also proposed by Ingo Althoefer in 2015, is San Jego: Here the pieces are not clobbered, but stacked to towers. Each tower belongs to the player with the piece on its top. At the end the player with the highest tower is declared winner. Draws are possible.
