= Banqi =

Two-player Chinese board game

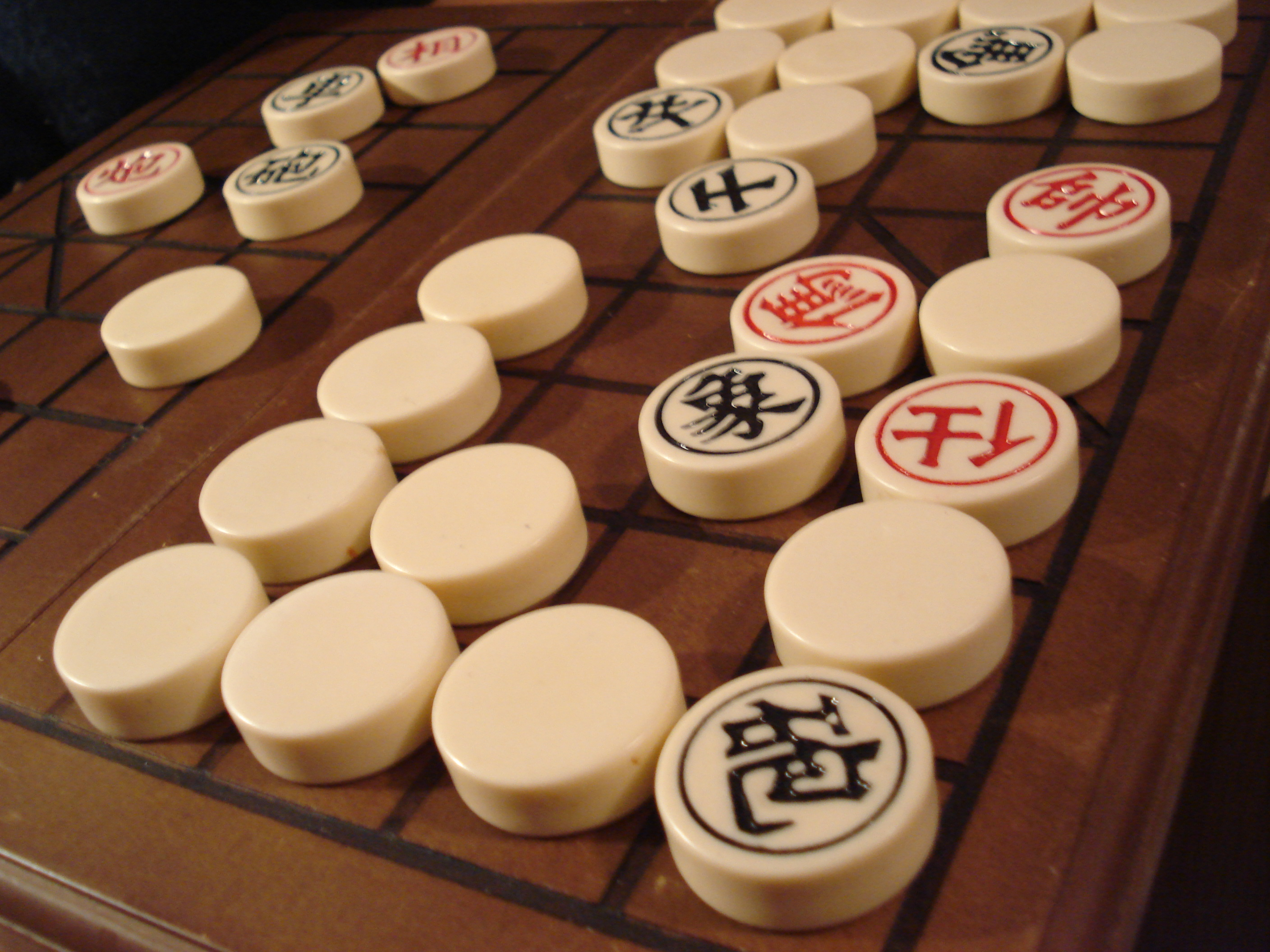
- Players: 2
- Setup time: < 1 minute
- Playing time: 5–15 minutes
- Chance: High
- Skills: Strategy, tactics
- Synonyms: Half Chess; Dark Chess; Blind Chess

Banqi (Chinese: 半棋; pinyin: bànqí) or Half Chess, also known as Dark Chess (暗棋) or Blind Chess (盲棋), is a two-player Chinese board game played on a 4×8 grid, or half of the xiangqi (Chinese chess) board. Most games last between ten and twenty minutes, but advanced games can last for an hour or more.

Banqi is a social game, usually played for fun rather than serious competition. A more formal version of Banqi may have evolved into the games Jungle and modern Luzhanqi.

== Equipment ==
Basic 4×8 Banqi board

=== Board ===
Although boards made specifically for Banqi exist, it is common to play on one half of the xiangqi board (using only one side of the River).

=== Pieces ===
Banqi uses xiangqi pieces. The backs of the pieces must be indistinguishable from each other so the pieces cannot be identified when face down. Pieces with international symbols printed on their backs are unsuitable. Each player controls five Soldiers, one General, and two each of the five other piece types, for a total of 16 pieces. In a typical set, one player's pieces are red, and the other player's pieces are black. The characters may also differ. For more detailed descriptions of the pieces used in this game, see the xiangqi article.

Name of piece	Number per side	Notes
General, king, marshal 帥 shuai, 將 jiàng	× 1	Highest rank. Captures everything except soldiers.
Advisor, guard, minister^{*}, assistant, mandarin, warrior 仕 shi, 士 shì	× 2	Second-highest rank in Mainland and Taiwanese versions. Fifth-highest rank in Hong Kong version.
Elephant, bishop, minister^{*} 相 xiàng, 象 xiàng	× 2	Third-highest rank in Mainland and Taiwanese versions. Sixth-highest rank in Hong Kong version.
Chariot, rook, cart 俥 jū, 車 jū	× 2	Fourth-highest rank in Mainland and Taiwanese versions. Second-highest rank in Hong Kong version.
Horse, knight, cavalry 傌 mà, 馬 mǎ	× 2	Fifth-highest rank in Mainland and Taiwanese versions. Third-highest rank in Hong Kong version
Soldier, pawn, private 兵 bīng, 卒 zú	× 5	Lowest rank, but it is able to capture the general.
Cannon, catapult 炮 pào, 砲 pào	× 2	In Taiwanese version, cannon may capture any piece, it must jump a screen to do so. Fourth-highest rank in Hong Kong version. Sixth-highest rank in Mainland version.

== Playing the game ==
The 32 pieces are shuffled and randomly allocated face-down to squares on the board. The pieces, as in Western chess, are placed inside the squares, rather than on the intersections as in Chinese chess.

The first player turns up a piece to begin the game. The color of that first uncovered piece is the color he or she will play in the game. The second player then makes a move, and the two alternate until the game is finished.

The game ends when a player cannot move, and that player is the loser. Most often, the game is lost because all of a player's pieces have been captured and so he has no pieces to move.

== Rules for moves ==
There are three kinds of moves. A player may turn a piece face-up, move a piece, or capture an enemy piece. In some game variants, multiple captures may be made in one turn.

=== Turning over a piece ===
Turning a piece face-up is a legal move if there are any face-down pieces on the board. Once revealed, a piece may move, capture, or be captured.

=== Moving a piece ===
A player may only move face-up pieces of their own color. All pieces move identically: a piece may move only one square up, down, left, or right. All pieces capture the same way that they move, except the cannon in the Taiwanese rules.

=== Capturing an opposing piece ===
A player may only capture with a face-up piece of their own color, and may only capture a face-up piece of the opposing color. In all captures, the captured piece is removed from the board and its square is occupied by the capturing piece.

The pieces are ranked, forming a hierarchy with the general at the top and soldiers at the bottom. Only pieces of equal or lower rank may be captured, with one exception. For instance, a chariot may capture a horse, and the general may capture either, but a horse cannot capture a chariot, and neither can capture the general. The one exception concerns generals and soldiers: the general cannot capture soldiers, and soldiers can capture the general.

In the Taiwanese version, the ranking goes as follows: General>Advisor>Elephant>Chariot>Horse>Soldier. Except for the cannon, the pieces capture with the same motion as for movement: one square up, down, left, or right. The cannon is not included in the ranking because it is exceptional: it can capture a piece of any rank, and yet is vulnerable to capture by any piece except the soldier. A cannon captures as in xiangqi: it moves any distance along a single row or column of the board, jumping over exactly one intermediate piece (called a screen). Any other squares between the cannon and its target must be empty. The color of the screening piece does not matter; it may be friend or foe, or even face down. While a cannon may capture any piece, it must jump a screen to do so. Since a cannon must jump to capture, it cannot capture a piece in an adjacent square.

In the Hong Kong version, the pieces are ranked in this order: General>Chariot>Horse>Cannon>Advisor>Elephant>Soldier. This ranking reflects the approximate value of the corresponding pieces in xiangqi (though the relative rank of horse and cannon is arguable). All pieces capture exactly as they move: one square up, down, left, or right.

The Mainland Chinese version is similar to the Taiwanese version, except that cannons cannot jump. The rank of a cannon is just above that of a soldier, so the ranking is: General>Advisor>Elephant>Chariot>Horse>Cannon>Soldier. Another difference is that a General/Marshal may capture a Soldier/Pawn if the General/Marshal moves first.

There are many other variations on the cannon capture rule that may add variety if desired:

- One variation gives cannons the ability to capture soldiers and other cannons directly, without jumping over a screen. In other words, the cannon acts like the other pieces, ranking between horse and soldier, but with the added ability of capturing any piece by catapulting.
- Another popular variation allows the attempted capture of a face-down piece, which if it can be captured is done so. If the piece cannot be captured due to its rank or color, then it is left face-up, and no movement takes place.
- A popular variation with children, allows multiple captures on the same turn for already exposed pieces as well as face-down pieces as long as they are successful.
- A variation that may change the strategy is that the cannon can not use a face down piece for a screen but can capture multiple pieces in a single turn. The cannon can not capture face down pieces in this variant.

=== Stalemate ===
A stalemate threat occurs when one player forces an endless cycle of moves. In a typical stalemate, the instigator repeatedly attacks, but cannot capture, an enemy piece. The legality of stalemating varies by culture:

- Some players consider stalemate illegal. This is consistent with the rules of Chinese Chess, which require the instigator to cease the continual attack, else the victim wins.
- Some players consider stalemate a legal strategy. The ability to instigate a stalemate in an otherwise losing game is one of the ways that skill can overcome luck, since the victim must accept either a drawn game or the loss of a piece. Handling a stalemate situation requires skill for the winning player, as well — the necessity of heading off a potential stalemate adds spice to an otherwise overwhelming victory. And deciding whether you can still win, even without that piece, requires great expertise.

Games in which stalemate is allowed tend to produce much more even games — many a lopsided game is turned into an interesting match by the surrender of a piece to avoid a stalemate.

== Strategy ==
- Early action – Under Taiwanese rules, playing first is a slight disadvantage. If the first player turns up a cannon, the opponent can turn up next to it with a high likelihood of capturing the cannon and no risk of losing their piece to the cannon. If the first player turns up anything else, the opponent can turn over a piece one hop away. If they find a cannon, it can take the first player's piece, but no matter what it is, the first player's piece can't immediately take the second player's. By convention, the new challenger plays first to give the previous game's loser a slight advantage.
- Chance – It is difficult to form strategy early on, since all pieces are hidden. This is a disadvantage to experienced players, who cannot follow a formulaic win strategy.
- Royalty – Unlike in xiangqi, the general is not royal; the game does not end because of the general's death. In fact, both generals usually die long before the end of the game. The game ends only when one player has no legal move. Banqi is often a game of attrition.
- Soldiers – Since there are five opposing soldiers, the mighty general is perversely vulnerable, and frequently the general turns out to be worthless in the face of a soldier front. This vulnerability makes the second-highest rank, chariots in Hong Kong or advisors in Taiwan, the most powerful pieces in many games.
  - It is often advantageous to search out and destroy the enemy soldiers, which the opponent may overlook as less valuable pieces. Once the enemy soldiers are eliminated, the general can roam free across the field in relative safety, vulnerable only to attacks by cannons and the opposing general.
- Cannons – Under Taiwanese rules, the cannon has devastating potential if it is well placed behind a shield of strong allied pieces. Given such position, a cannon can be stronger than either general or advisor, especially if the opposing general and/or advisors have limited lateral mobility—that is, if they can't sidestep a cannon attack. On the other hand, the opponent has plenty of pieces that can capture the cannon if only they can get next to it, so a poorly placed cannon is usually short-lived. Most players will readily sacrifice a horse, chariot, or elephant to capture a cannon.
- Hidden pieces – Play is often directed by the face-down pieces. Pieces are vulnerable in a dead-end "tunnel" (a sequence of empty squares one square wide, surrounded by face-down pieces), in which there is no escape from a pursuing enemy piece.
  - If there is enough space between the defender and the attacker, the defender will have time to turn up some face-down pieces before the attacker closes in. If the defender gets to an open area at least 2 x 2 in size, they can use that "rotation space" to dodge a single enemy piece by sidestepping. The defender can sometimes create a rotation space by turning up a smaller enemy piece on the inside corner of a bend in the tunnel, or they might be able to punch through a wall of the tunnel to reach an open area on the other side.
  - It is often important to keep track of what pieces are still face-down. Usually this is done by checking both the "graveyard" for dead pieces and the playing field for live pieces; by the process of elimination a player pcan figure out what must still remain.
- Resignation – A player may simply resign if the game seems lopsided.
- Attrition – Exchanging equal pieces is usually to the advantage of the player who is ahead. When winning by a sufficient margin, even disadvantageous trades can accelerate victory if chosen carefully.
- Objective – Often, the move that will win most quickly (or break an impending stalemate) gives away the most valuable piece. Such moves are often overlooked.
- Evasion – Some players derive pleasure from making it as difficult as possible for the opponent to actually coerce the win. Others make a game of seeing how many opposing pieces they can capture before their demise. Some just resign when defeat becomes evident, and start a new game.
- Parity – Parity is important, especially in the end game. In situations where only an opposing general and pawn are left with one space between, turn order invariably determines the winner. The pawn's move will produce a stalemate, while the general's move will result in his inevitable capture.
- Pinning – It is fairly easy to pin a piece against the edge of the board. Frequently, being pinned or not is the difference between defeat and stalemate.

== Computer play ==
In computer-game research, Banqi is often discussed under the name Chinese dark chess. The game is difficult for conventional game-tree search because choosing to turn over a face-down piece introduces stochastic outcomes. Chen, Shen, and Hsu estimated its state-space complexity at about 10^{37} and its game-tree complexity at about 10^{135}, and argued that search methods such as alpha–beta pruning are mainly suitable in positions where revealing actions no longer influence the result.

Computer Banqi programs have used alpha–beta search, expected-value treatment of reveal outcomes, Monte Carlo tree search, opening books, and endgame databases.

At the 2024 Computer Olympiad Chinese dark chess tournament, six teams participated, and the winner was CLAP_CDC, an AlphaZero-based program.

== Variants ==
Banqi can be played on an 8×8 board using two sets of xiangqi pieces (black, red, blue and green).

There is also an app, which is a single player vs computer only game. This application is using Taiwan rule. AI is using basic minimax tree structure and some rules. Advanced algorithm are not used.
