= Octi =

Abstract strategy game

Octi is an abstract strategy game designed by Donald Green for 2 or 4 players. The game was first published in 1999 by The Great American Trading Company.

The game was originally designed to be played on a 9-by-9 board. A smaller version of the game for kids can be played on a 6-by-7 board.

The game has been noted to be resistant to the techniques used in computer chess. In the 2001 Computer Octi Tournament, a computer program was able to beat the game's designer on the 6x7 version of the board, while unable to do so on the full 9x9 version. The game was also one of the categories in the 9th Computer Olympiad in 2004.

Octi is supported by Smart Game Format file format.
