= Quintiq =

Supply chain optimisation software

Quintiq is a planning, scheduling and supply chain optimisation software solution originally developed by Quintiq B.V. in the Netherlands. The software is headquartered in 's-Hertogenbosch. Since the integration into the DELMIA product family of Dassault Systèmes in October 2014, the product has been known as DELMIA Quintiq.

It is built using a mixture of C++ and Java.

== History ==
The company was founded in 's-Hertogenbosch (Den Bosch) in September 1997 by former Bolesian employees including Dr. Victor Allis. Allis and several colleagues initially began developing a scheduling application for an aluminium manufacturer as a side project. It was offered first to Allis's then-employer, but Bolesian was not interested. Because the software they developed was highly configurable, and thus of use to many other types of companies, it was decided that a new firm should be created around the software. Preparing the software for sale to as wide a variety as possible of corporate customers took two years of development.

Quintiq sold its software to a client for the first time in 1999.

In 2011, two investment firms, LLR Partners Inc. and NewSpring Capital Ventures LP, bought into Quintiq, giving them a 48% stake in the company's ownership.

Later in 2014, Quintiq was bought by Dassault Systèmes. Since then, it has no longer been listed as a separate company in the Netherlands chamber of Commerce.

== Products ==
Quintiq's Supply Chain Planning software has three layers or modules: one based on service-oriented architecture, with both optimisation and planning management features; one that provides a variety of different templates for use in different industries; and one customised for each Quintiq customer. Quintiq uses AI pattern recognition to help customers manage their supply chain logistics. Other features of the software include adaptive capacity planning, automated real-time scheduling, a multi-function company planner, a multi-scenario macro planner, materials management tools, and proprietary algorithms for coordinating production with customer orders. Competitor software is more robust in a number of specific areas, and for this reason some Quintiq users employ both Quintiq software and competitors' products in a hybrid approach to supply chain management.^{[needs update]}

=== Quill ===
Quill is a proprietary, object-oriented programming language used in the development and customization of software within the Quintiq platform. It is considered a fifth-generation programming language and features a syntax that is similar to Java. Quill enables users to define business logic and model behavior through high-level constructs, including a feature called quantors (similar to the mathematical quantifiers), which facilitate the concise expression of complex logical operations.

In the Quintiq environment, software models are created using a hybrid approach that combines graphical interfaces and scripting. The graphical interface, known as the Business Logic Editor, allows users to construct and manage elements of the model visually. Quill complements this by providing the scripting capabilities necessary to implement detailed or custom behaviors, algorithms, and decision-making logic. Rather than operating as a standalone development language, Quill is integrated into the modeling workflow, serving as a scripting layer within a broader model-based design framework.

It features multiple algorithm frameworks for planning optimisation, most notably:

- Linear Programming via CPLEX
- Path optimisation algorithms
- Graph algorithms
- Constraint programming
- Mathematical programming
- Local Search

== Locations ==
DELMIA Quintiq has 184 offices on all six inhabited continents. Most notably:

- s-Hertogenbosch, Netherlands (Global & European headquarters)
- Radnor, Pennsylvania, USA (North American headquarters)
- Petaling Jaya, Malaysia (Asian-Pacific headquarters)
- Melbourne, Australia (Oceanic operational base)

== Clients ==
Notable companies and organisations which use Quintiq software include:

- Copenhagen Airport
- Frankfurt Airport
- Air navigation provider Skyguide
- Food producer Danone
- international shipping company DHL
- Federal Aviation Administration
- Supermarket Jumbo
- KLM Royal Dutch Airlines
- ThyssenKrupp Steel Europe AG
- freight forwarder P&O Ferrymaster
- copper recycler Aurubis
- Packaging specialist SIG
- retailer Walmart

== Acquisition ==
On July 24, 2014, Dassault Systèmes announced plans to acquire Quintiq for $336 million. The deal was subject to regulatory approval in Germany and Austria. By October 2014, the sale was complete.
