= And–or tree =

Type of tree data structure

An and–or tree is a graphical representation of the reduction of problems (or goals) to conjunctions and disjunctions of subproblems (or subgoals).

== Example ==
The and–or tree:

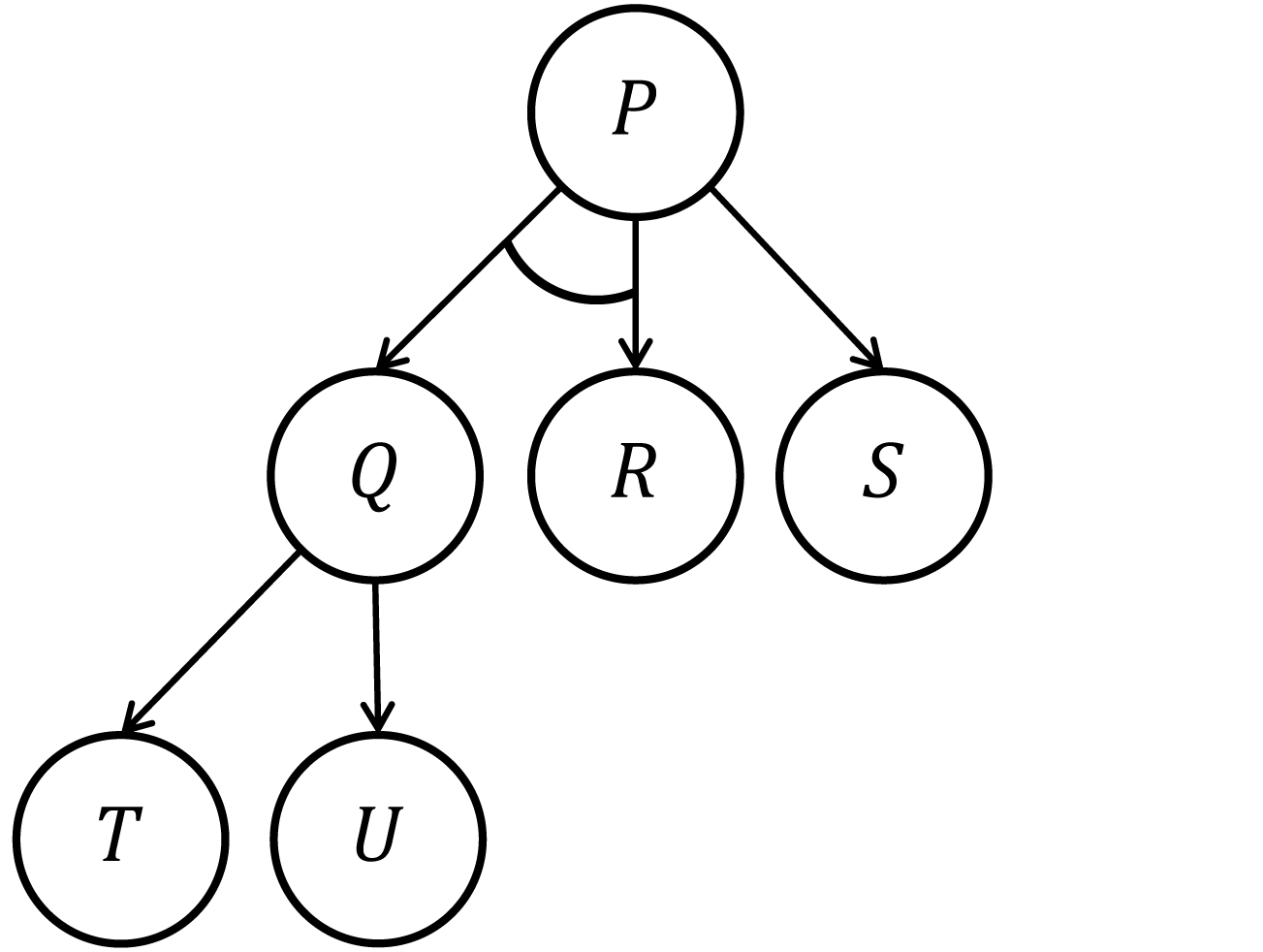

represents the search space for solving the problem P, using the goal-reduction methods:

P if Q and R

P if S

Q if T

Q if U

== Definitions ==
Given an initial problem P_{0} and set of problem solving methods of the form:

P if P_{1} and … and P_{n}

the associated and–or tree is a set of labelled nodes such that:

1. The root of the tree is a node labelled by P_{0}.
2. For every node N labelled by a problem or sub-problem P and for every method of the form P if P_{1} and ... and P_{n}, there exists a set of children nodes N_{1}, ..., N_{n} of the node N, such that each node N_{i} is labelled by P_{i}. The nodes are conjoined by an arc, to distinguish them from children of N that might be associated with other methods.

A node N, labelled by a problem P, is a success node if there is a method of the form P if nothing (i.e., P is a "fact"). The node is a failure node if there is no method for solving P.

If all of the children of a node N, conjoined by the same arc, are success nodes, then the node N is also a success node. Otherwise the node is a failure node.

== Search strategies ==
An and–or tree specifies only the search space for solving a problem. Different search strategies for searching the space are possible. These include searching the tree depth-first, breadth-first, or best-first using some measure of desirability of solutions. The search strategy can be sequential, searching or generating one node at a time, or parallel, searching or generating several nodes in parallel.

== Relationship with logic programming ==
The methods used for generating and–or trees are propositional logic programs (without variables). In the case of logic programs containing variables, the solutions of conjoint sub-problems must be compatible. Subject to this complication, sequential and parallel search strategies for and–or trees provide a computational model for executing logic programs.

== Relationship with two-player games ==
And–or trees can also be used to represent the search spaces for two-person games. The root node of such a tree represents the problem of one of the players winning the game, starting from the initial state of the game. Given a node N, labelled by the problem P of the player winning the game from a particular state of play, there exists a single set of conjoint children nodes, corresponding to all of the opponents responding moves. For each of these children nodes, there exists a set of non-conjoint children nodes, corresponding to all of the player's defending moves.

For solving game trees with proof-number search family of algorithms, game trees are to be mapped to and–or trees. MAX-nodes (i.e. maximizing player to move) are represented as OR nodes, MIN-nodes map to AND nodes. The mapping is possible, when the search is done with only a binary goal, which usually is "player to move wins the game".

== Bibliography ==
- Luger, George F.; Stubblefield, William A. (1993). Artificial intelligence: structures and strategies for complex problem solving (2 ed.). The Benjamin/Cummings. ISBN 978-0-8053-4785-2.
- Nilsson, Nils J. (1998). Artificial Intelligence: A New Synthesis. Morgan Kaufmann. ISBN 978-1-55860-467-4.
- Russell, S. and Norvig, P., 2021. Artificial Intelligence: a modern approach, 4th US ed. University of California, Berkeley, p 141.
