= Donald Green =

American political scientist (born 1961)

Donald P. Green
- Born: June 23, 1961 (age 65)

Academic background
- Education: University of California, Berkeley
- Thesis: Self-interest, public opinion, and mass political behavior (1988)
- Doctoral advisor: Jack Citrin

Academic work
- Discipline: Political science
- Institutions: Columbia University
- Doctoral students: Andra Gillespie

Donald Philip Green (born June 23, 1961) is a political scientist and quantitative methodologist at Columbia University. Green's primary research interests lie in the development of statistical methods for field experiments and their application to American voting behavior.

== Biography ==
In 1983, Green graduated summa cum laude with a B.A. in political science and history from UCLA. In 1984, he earned an M.A. and in 1988 a Ph.D. in political science at the University of California, Berkeley for thesis titled Self-interest, public opinion, and mass political behavior.

Green's career in academia began in 1989, when he became an assistant professor in the department of political science at Yale University. He was there until 2011, when he moved to Columbia University. At Yale, he also served as the director of the Institution for Social and Policy Studies, Yale's center for interdisciplinary research in the social sciences and public policy, from 1996 to 2011.

To date, Green has authored or coauthored four books and over 100 journal articles and book chapters. The varied topics of his scholarship include experimental research methods, voter turnout and persuasion, political party identification, prejudice and hate crime, rational choice theory, public opinion, and statistical methods.

He was elected to the American Academy of Arts and Sciences in 2003 and was awarded the Heinz I. Eulau Award for best article published in the American Political Science Review during 2009. He is an affiliate of the Abdul Latif Jameel Poverty Action Lab.

In December 2014, Green and UCLA graduate student Michael LaCour published a highly publicized study, When contact changes minds, on attitudes towards same-sex marriage, in Science. In May 2015, however, Green requested that the article be withdrawn after colleagues and former students identified misrepresentations and data "irregularities" in the paper.

In 2016, Green was appointed the John William Burgess Professor at Columbia University. He was named Faculty Advisor of the Year by Columbia's Political Science Graduate Student Council.

== Inventions ==
Donald Green has designed several boardgames. Green has invented OCTI, OCTI-for-Kids, Jumpin' Java, Mouse Island, Razzle Dazzle, Knight Moves, Fishpond Mancala, and Dupe. In 1999, OCTI was named "Best Abstract Strategy Game of the Year" by Games magazine.

== Selected publications ==
- Pathologies of rational choice theory: A critique of applications in political science (New Haven, CT: Yale University Press, 1993), with Ian Shapiro
- Partisan hearts and minds: Political parties and the social identities of voters (New Haven, CT: Yale University Press, 1993), with Eric Schickler and Bradley Palmquist
- Field Experiments: Design, Analysis, and Interpretation. (New York: W.W. Norton., 2012), with Alan S. Gerber
- Lacour, M. J.; Green, D. P. (2014). "When contact changes minds: An experiment on transmission of support for gay equality". Science. 346 (6215): 1366–9. Bibcode:2014Sci...346.1366L. doi:10.1126/science.1256151. PMID 25504721. S2CID 6322609. (Retracted, see doi:10.1126/science.aac6638, PMID 26022417, Retraction Watch)
- Get Out The Vote: How to Increase Voter Turnout, Third Edition. (Washington, D.C.: Brookings Institution Press, 2015), with Alan S. Gerber
