= Washington Technology University =

American private university

Coordinates: 47.6121692°N 122.190091°W

- Motto: "Grow, Explore, Learn"
- Type: Private
- Active: 2017–July 29, 2022
- President: Steve Olswang
- Location: Bellevue, Washington, United States
- Mascot: Red Pandas
- Website: washtechu.com

Washington Technology University (WTU) was an American private university based in Bellevue, Washington. The school offered a bachelor's degree in information security targeted at local residents wanting to join the Seattle technology industry, and admitted its first class in January 2018. On October 22, 2021, the Washington Student Achievement Council denied Washington Technology University's (WTU) application for renewal of authorization to operate in Washington. WTU had been authorized to operate in Washington State since 2017, and offered one degree program at its campus in Bellevue, Washington. The school officially shut down July 29, 2022.

WTU may provide a teach-out of its currently enrolled students until those students complete their degree requirements but is not permitted to recruit or enroll new students. WTU indicated that it intends to appeal the denial of its application for renewal of authorization.

== Proposed branch campus ==
Beginning in August 2017, several months before the main campus opened to students, WTU was in discussions with landowners around North Bend to open a branch campus on part of the site of the former Mountain Meadows Farm. The campus would be combined with returning the farm to full agricultural production and would offer courses in technology as well as programs in agricultural science, viticulture, and hotel management. At a meeting about the project local residents expressed concerns such as increased traffic and load on sewer systems, with some aggressively opposing the project.
