= Tic-tac-toe variants =

A complete game of Notakto, a misère variant of the game

Tic-tac-toe is an instance of an m,n,k-game, where two players alternate taking turns on an m×n board until one of them gets k in a row. Harary's generalized tic-tac-toe is an even broader generalization. The game can also be generalized as a n^{d} game. The game can be generalised even further from the above variants by playing on an arbitrary hypergraph where rows are hyperedges and cells are vertices.

Many board games share the element of trying to be the first to get n-in-a-row, including three men's morris, nine men's morris, pente, gomoku, Qubic, Connect Four, Quarto, Gobblet, Order and Chaos, Toss Across, and Mojo.

Variants of tic-tac-toe date back several millennia.

== Historic ==
An early variation of tic-tac-toe was played in the Roman Empire, around the first century BC. It was called Terni Lapilli and instead of having any number of pieces, each player only had three; thus, they had to move them around to empty spaces to keep playing. The game's grid markings have been found chalked all over Rome. However, according to Claudia Zaslavsky's book Tic Tac Toe: And Other Three-In-A Row Games from Ancient Egypt to the Modern Computer, Tic-tac-toe could be traced back to ancient Egypt. Another closely related ancient game is three men's morris, which is also played on a simple grid and requires three pieces in a row to finish.

== Variants in higher dimensions ==
=== 3D Tic-tac-toe ===
Three-dimensional tic-tac-toe on a 3×3×3 board. In this game, the first player has an easy win by playing in the centre if two people are playing.

One can play on a board of 4×4 squares, winning in several ways. Winning can include: four in a straight line, four in a diagonal line, four in a diamond, or four to make a square. Another variant, Qubic, is played on a 4×4×4 board; it was solved by Oren Patashnik in 1980 (the first player can force a win). Higher-dimensional variations are also possible.

The 3D tic tac toe variant does not always appear as 3 dimensional board. Some variants have different forms. For example in the case of Gobblet-like variant, Gobblet Gobblers and Otrio, the third element appears as variation in marker sizes (small, medium, large). Players can 'steal' the opponent spot by placing larger marker at the top of the opponent smaller marker or just simply competing with overlapping spot.

== Misère games ==
=== Misere Tic-tac-toe ===
In misère tic-tac-toe, the player wins if the opponent gets n in a row. This game is also known as avoidance tic tac toe, toe-tac-tic, inverse tic tac toe, or reverse tic tac toe. A 3×3 game is a draw. More generally, the first player can draw or win the $n$-in-a-row game on an $n\times n\times\cdots\times n$ board (of any dimension), when $n$ is odd, by playing first in the central cell and then mirroring the opponent's moves across the central cell. This mirroring strategy prevents the creation of any line through the center, and any other line would be created by the second player before it is mirrored by the first player.

=== Notakto ===
Notakto is a misere and impartial form of tic tac toe. This means unlike in misere tic tac toe, in Notakto, both players play as the same symbol, X. It also can be played on one or multiple boards.

== Variants with bigger boards ==
=== Quixo ===
The game Quixo is played on a five-by-five board of cubes with two players or teams. On a player's turn, they select a blank cube or a cube with their symbol on it that is at the edge of the board. If a blank cube was selected, the cube is turned to be the player's symbol (either an X or O). The game ends when one player gets five in a row.

=== Unrestricted n-in-a-row ===
Unrestricted n-in-a-row is played on an infinite tic-tac-toe board where the goal is for one player to get n in a row.

=== Amőba ===
The game called Amőba (amoeba) in Hungary is played on squared paper; it is a five-in-a-row variant. The winner of a match gets to fence in the completed game with a tight continuous line resulting in an amoeba-looking shape, hence the name.

=== Ultimate tic-tac-toe ===
In Ultimate tic-tac-toe, the board is composed of a large tic-tac-toe board where each cell contains another standard tic-tac-toe board. A move in the smaller boards determines the location of the next move in the larger board.

== Isomorphic games ==
=== Number Scrabble ===
There is a game that is isomorphic to tic-tac-toe, but on the surface appears completely different. It is called Pick15 or Number Scrabble. Two players in turn say a number between one and nine. A particular number may not be repeated. The game is won by the player who has said three numbers whose sum is 15. If all the numbers are used and no one gets three numbers that add up to 15 then the game is a draw. Plotting these numbers on a 3×3 magic square shows that the game exactly corresponds with tic-tac-toe, since three numbers will be arranged in a straight line if and only if they total 15.

=== Word Tic-tac-toe ===
eat
bee
less
→e
air
bits
lip
→i
soda
book
lot
→o
↙

s

↓

a

↓

b

↓

l

↘

t

Another isomorphic game uses a list of nine carefully chosen words, for instance "eat", "bee", "less", "air", "bits", "lip", "soda", "book", and "lot". Each player picks one word in turn and to win, a player must select three words with the same letter. The words may be plotted on a tic-tac-toe grid in such a way that a three in a row line wins.

== Dexterity variants ==
Tic tac toe can be played by integrating element of dexterity to place the markers. Objects such as balls can be thrown to a grid (which can be made from other objects such as glasses) to get three marks in a row, leaving elements of probability for the markers to be landed at the intended spot and stimulating physical exercises.

== Other variants ==
=== Numerical Tic-Tac-Toe ===
Numerical Tic Tac Toe is a variation invented by the mathematician Ronald Graham. The numbers 1 to 9 are used in this game. The first player plays with the odd numbers, the second player plays with the even numbers. All numbers can be used only once. The player who puts down 15 points in a line wins (sum of 3 numbers). This game can be generalized to a n × n board.

=== Check Lines ===
In the 1970s, there was a two-player game made by Tri-ang Toys & Games called Check Lines, in which the board consisted of eleven holes arranged in a geometrical pattern of twelve straight lines each containing three of the holes. Each player had exactly five tokens and played in turn placing one token in any of the holes. The winner was the first player whose tokens were arranged in two lines of three (which by definition were intersecting lines). If neither player had won by the tenth turn, subsequent turns consisted of moving one of one's own tokens to the remaining empty hole, with the constraint that this move could only be from an adjacent hole.

=== Twice crosses-circles ===
- Programmed in 1989, the algorithm was previously tested on the Elektronika MK-52. There is also a variant of the game with the classic 3×3 field, in which it is necessary to make two rows to win, while the opposing algorithm only needs one.

=== Quantum Tic-Tac-Toe ===
Quantum tic tac toe allows players to place a quantum superposition of numbers on the board, i.e. the players' moves are "superpositions" of plays in the original classical game. This variation was invented by Allan Goff of Novatia Labs.

A complete game of Wild tic-tac-toe

=== Wild Tic-Tac-Toe ===
In wild tic-tac-toe, players can choose to place either an X or O on each move. It can be played as a normal game where the player who makes three in a row wins or a misere game where they would lose. This game is also called your-choice tic-tac-toe or Devil's tic-tac-toe.

=== SOS ===
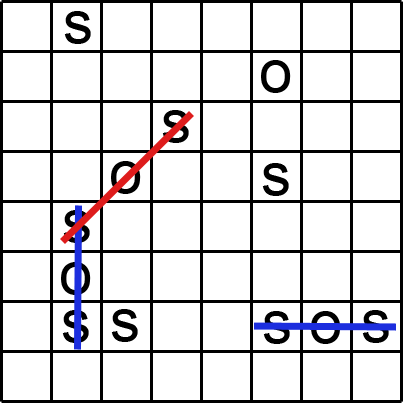
An incomplete game of SOS in an 8x8 board

In the game SOS, the players on each turn choose to play a "S" or an "O" in an empty square. If a player makes the sequence SOS vertically, horizontally or diagonally they get a point and also take another turn. The player with the most points (SOSs) is the winner.

=== Treblecross ===
A completed game of Treblecross

In Treblecross, both players play with the same symbol (an X or black chip). The game is played on a 1-by-n board with k equal to 3. The player who makes a three in a row of Xs (or black chips) wins the game.

=== Revenge n-in-a-row ===
In revenge n-in-a-row, the player who makes an n-in-a-row wins unless the opponent can make an n-in-a-row in the next move where they lose.

=== Random turn Tic-Tac-Toe ===
In the game random turn tic-tac-toe, a coin flip determines whose turn it is.

=== Quick Tic-Tac-Toe ===
In quick-tac-toe, on each turn the players can play their mark in any squares they want provided that all the marks are in the same vertical or horizontal row. The winner is the player who places the last mark.
