= Ultimate tic-tac-toe =

Variant of tic-tac-toe game

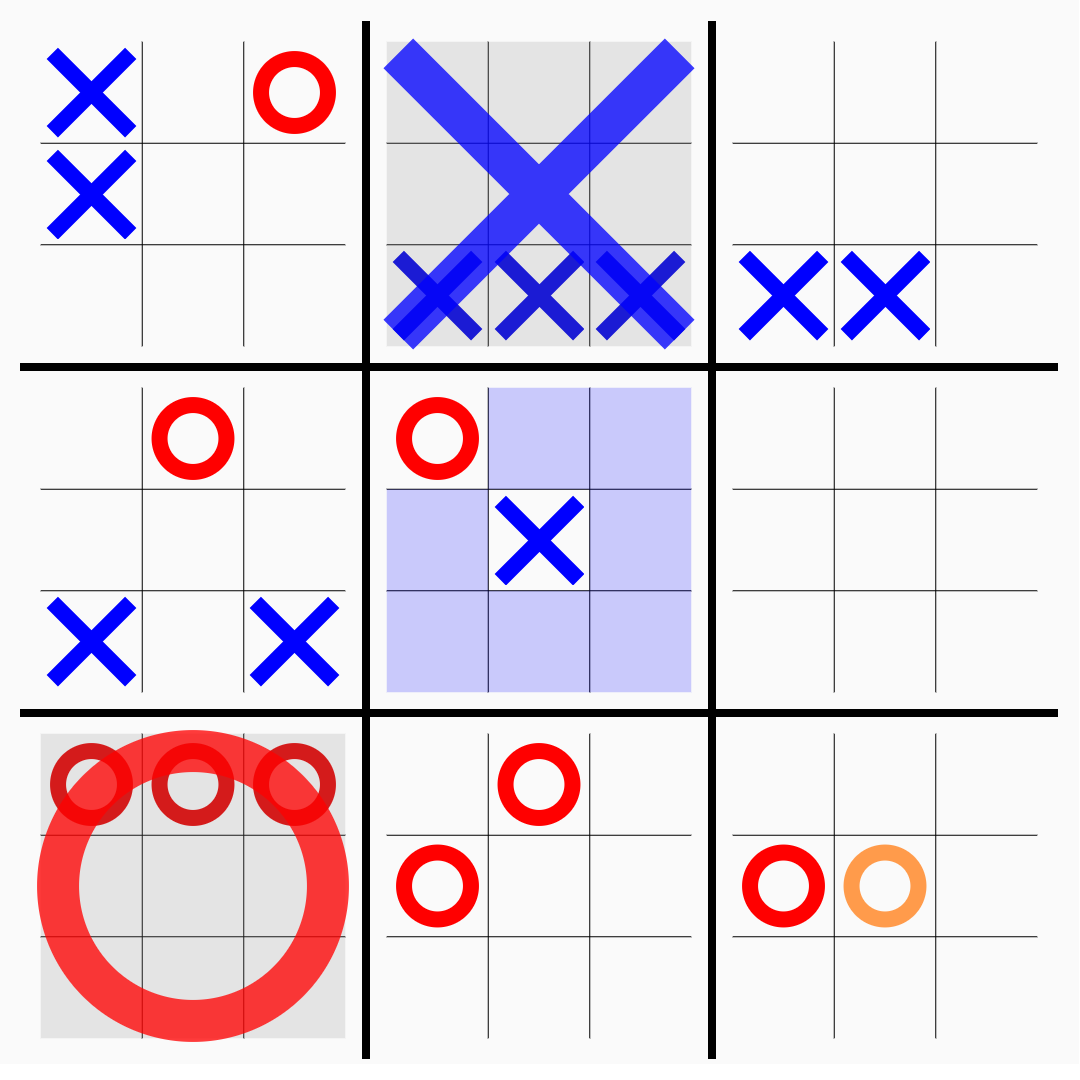
Incomplete ultimate tic-tac-toe game (the large 'X's and 'O's represent small boards that are won by that player). The previous move was O playing in the center square of the bottom-right board (in yellow), forcing X to play their next move in smaller board located in the center of the larger board (in blue).

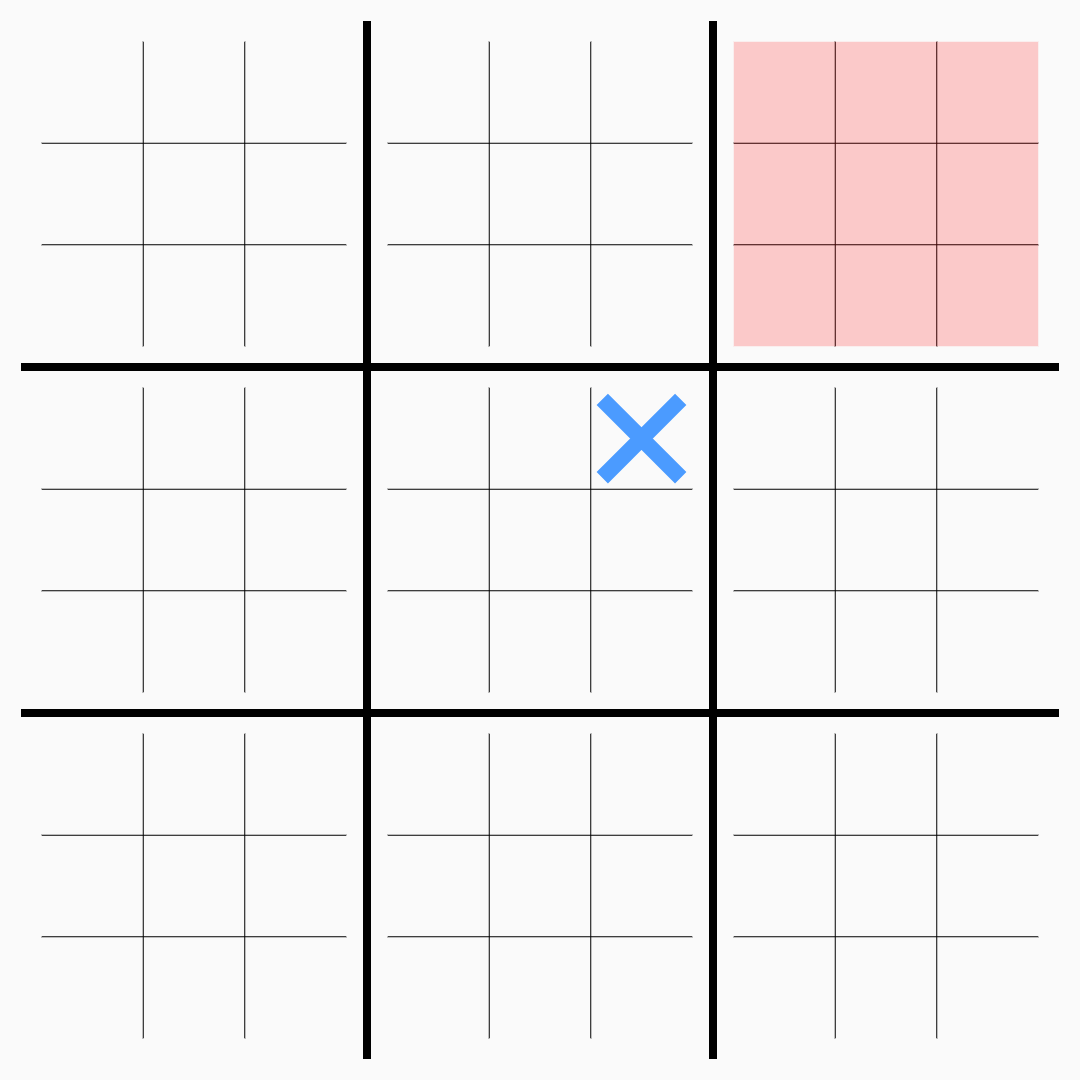
Since X played in the top-right corner of the small board, O is forced to play their next move in the top-right small board of the larger board (highlighted in red).

Ultimate tic-tac-toe (also known as UTT, super tic-tac-toe, meta tic-tac-toe, (tic-tac-toe)², strategic tic-tac-toe, mega tic-tac-toe , or Ultimate Noughts and Crosses) is a board game composed of nine tic-tac-toe boards arranged in a 3 × 3 grid. Players take turns playing on the smaller tic-tac-toe boards until one of them wins on the larger board. Compared to traditional tic-tac-toe, strategy in this game is conceptually more difficult and has proven more challenging for computers.

== Rules ==
Just like in regular tic-tac-toe, the two players (X and O) take turns. The game starts with either X or O playing wherever they want in any of the 81 empty spots. On each subsequent move, the players must play in the section of the larger board corresponding to the previous move's location within the smaller board it was played in.

If a move is played so that it wins a small board by the rules of normal tic-tac-toe, then the entire small board is marked as won by the player in the larger board. Once a small board is won by a player or it is filled completely, no more moves can be played in that board, and a player sent to that board may choose any other valid board to play in.

The game ends when either a player wins the larger board or there are no playable small boards remaining, in which case the game is a draw.

== Gameplay ==
Ultimate tic-tac-toe is significantly more complex than most other variations of tic-tac-toe, as there is no clear strategy to playing. This is because of the complicated game branching in this game. Even though every move must be played in a small board, equivalent to a normal tic-tac-toe board, each move must take into account the larger board in several ways:

1. Anticipating the next move: Each move played in a small board determines where the opponent's next move can be played. This might make moves that are considered bad in normal tic-tac-toe viable, since the opponent is forced to play on certain board. This way a player could play the same smaller board multiple times in a row, without their opponent being able to respond. Therefore, players are forced to consider the larger game board instead of simply focusing on the smaller boards.
2. Visualizing the game tree: Visualizing future branches of the game tree is more difficult than single board tic-tac-toe. Each move determines the next move, and therefore reading ahead—predicting future moves—follows a much less linear path. Future board positions are no longer interchangeable, each move leading to starkly different possible future positions. This makes the game tree difficult to visualize, possibly leaving many possible paths overlooked.
3. Winning the game: Due to the rules of ultimate tic-tac-toe, the larger board is never directly affected. It is governed only by actions that occur in smaller boards. This means that each move played is not intended to win the small board, but to win the larger board. In fact, it may be strategic to sacrifice a small board to your opponent in order to win a more important small board yourself. This added layer of complexity makes it harder to analyze the relative importance and significance of moves, and consequently harder to play well.

== Computer implementations ==
While tic-tac-toe is elementary to solve and can be done nearly instantly using depth-first search, ultimate tic-tac-toe cannot be reasonably solved using any brute-force tactics. Therefore, more creative computer implementations are necessary to play this game.

The most common artificial intelligence (AI) tactic, minimax, may be used to play ultimate tic-tac-toe, but has difficulty playing this. This is because, despite having relatively simple rules, ultimate tic-tac-toe lacks any simple heuristic evaluation function. This function is necessary in minimax, for it determines how good a specific position is. Although elementary evaluation functions can be made for ultimate tic-tac-toe by taking into account the number of small board victories, these largely overlook positional advantage that is much harder to quantify. Without any efficient evaluation function, most typical computer implementations are weak, and therefore there are few computer opponents that can consistently outplay humans.

However, artificial intelligence algorithms that don't need evaluation functions, like the Monte Carlo tree-search algorithm, have no problem in playing this game. The Monte Carlo tree search relies on random simulations of games to determine how good a position is instead of a positional evaluation and is therefore able to accurately assess how good a current position is. Therefore, computer implementations using these algorithms tend to outperform minimax solutions and can consistently beat human opponents.

== Variants ==
A variant of the game requires players to continue playing in already decided boxes if there are still empty spaces. This allows the game to last longer and involves further strategic moves. It was shown in 2020 that this set of rules for the game admits a winning strategy for the first player to move, meaning that the first player to move can always win assuming perfect play. If playing with this rule set is still preferred, the forced-win problem can be practically solved by generating the first 4 moves at random. This is most effectively done by randomly generating a 5-digit number, then using the first digit to select a larger board and the next four digits to place "X"s and "O"s in the appropriate small board.

It is also possible to create an expanded version of Ultimate Tic Tac Toe by effectively creating more layers of nested Tic Tac Toe games within the larger board. For example, a game that has a further layer would have 81 base level Tic Tac Toe boards.

Tic-Tac-Ku, a game invented by Mark Asperheim and Cris Van Oosterum, has similar rules to ultimate tic-tac-toe, however a player wins the game by winning at least five small boards, instead of three in a line.

Triple tac toe is a version similar to this. The rules are the s‌ame but players can overt‌ake a piece by getting more o‌f their symbol on the board so a p‌iece changes from O to X or X to O

== See also ==
- Recursion
- Tic-tac-toe variants
