= Futile game =

Game which may tie when both players play optimally

Tic-tac-toe, a classic futile game

In game theory, a futile game is a game that permits a draw or a tie when optimal moves are made by both players. An example of this type of game is the classical form of Tic-tac-toe, though not all variants are futile games. The term does not apply to intransitive games, such as iterated prisoner's dilemma or rock–paper–scissors, in which there is no path to a draw or every strategy in the game can be beaten by another strategy.

== See also ==
- Partisan game
- Impartial game
- Solved game
