= Lunatix Online: Global Insanity Crisis =

1999 video game

- Developer: Prowler Productions
- Publisher: Prowler Productions
- Platform: Browser
- Release: January 1999
- Genres: Adventure, RPG, MMO
- Mode: Multiplayer

Lunatix Online: Global Insanity Crisis, also known as Lunatix Online, was an online browser-based RPG set in a mental institution. The player would take the role of a patient with one of three mental defects, with every defect coming with different special abilities. The whole game was round-based with every player only getting a few moves per day. The goal of the game was to escape the institution.

== History and development ==
Lunatix Online was released in January 1999 for browsers and was developed and published by Prowler Productions. In 2006, Lunatix Online turned 7 years old and became one of the longest running browser-based multiplayer online games at that time. Until 2008, players who had escaped the institution five times would be rewarded with real world prizes including Lunatix branded mouse pads and clocks.

== Gameplay ==
Gameplay was round based, with rounds taking place in 24 hour blocks. Each day, the player could take a number of actions around their room and the grounds of the institution. Gameplay included combat, puzzles and mini games including a Tic-tac-toe variant.

Lunatix was known for its outlandish over the top humor, and often used the players mental defect as a source of humor or adventure. For example, the player could use a toothbrush as weapon, fight a plush rabbit or perceive themselves time traveling and speaking to famous historical figures.

The interface was separated in two sections. The upper half of the interface displayed a picture and a description of the room the player inhabited at the moment as well as a list of options for the next actions the player could take. The bottom half of the interface was reserved for chat which could be utilized to speak to other player in the area.

== Server Shutdown ==
The servers hosting Lunatix Online were permanently shutdown on October 1, 2010.
