= Notakto =

Pen and paper game

- A completed game of Notakto played across three boards
- Genres: paper-and-pencil game
- Playing time: 1-15 minutes

Notakto is a tic-tac-toe variant, also known as neutral or impartial tic-tac-toe. The game is a combination of the games tic-tac-toe and Nim, played across one or several boards with both of the players playing the same piece (an "X" or cross). The game ends when all the boards contain a three-in-a-row of Xs, at which point the player to have made the last move loses the game. However, in this game, unlike tic-tac-toe, there will always be a player who wins any game of Notakto.

Notakto is an impartial game, where the allowable moves depend only on the state of the game and not on which player is taking their turn. When played across multiple boards it is a disjunctive game. The game is attributed to professor and backgammon player Bob Koca, who is said to have invented the game in 2010, when his five-year-old nephew suggested playing a game of tic-tac-toe with both players as "X".

== Play ==
Notakto is played on a finite number of empty three-by-three boards. Then, each player takes turns placing an X on the board(s) in a vacant space (a space not occupied by an X already on the board). If a board has a three-in-a-row, the board is dead and it cannot be played on any more. When one player makes a three-in-a-row and there are no more boards to play on, that player loses.

== Optimal strategy ==
The "finger trap", in which the first player (who started by playing the center "X") is guaranteed a win

The optimal strategy for a single-board game of Notakto allows the first player to force a win. It is for the first player to play the center and then play a knight's move (two squares vertically and one square horizontally, or vice versa) away from the opponent's play. This strategy works because it makes a boot-like structure, which is called the boot trap. From the boot trap position the first player will be able to force a win.

With two boards, the second player should on their first move play in the center square of the empty board (the one with no Xs in it). Then, the second player sacrifices one of the boards (by making a three-in-a-row) if it is possible. Now, the game is a 1-board game of Notakto so the second player uses the knight's move or boot trap strategies to win.

From these two strategies, any game with more than two boards can always be won by the first player (on an odd number of boards) or by the second player (on an even number of boards).

== See also ==
- Misère
