= Ernst Zermelo =

German logician and mathematician (1871–1953)

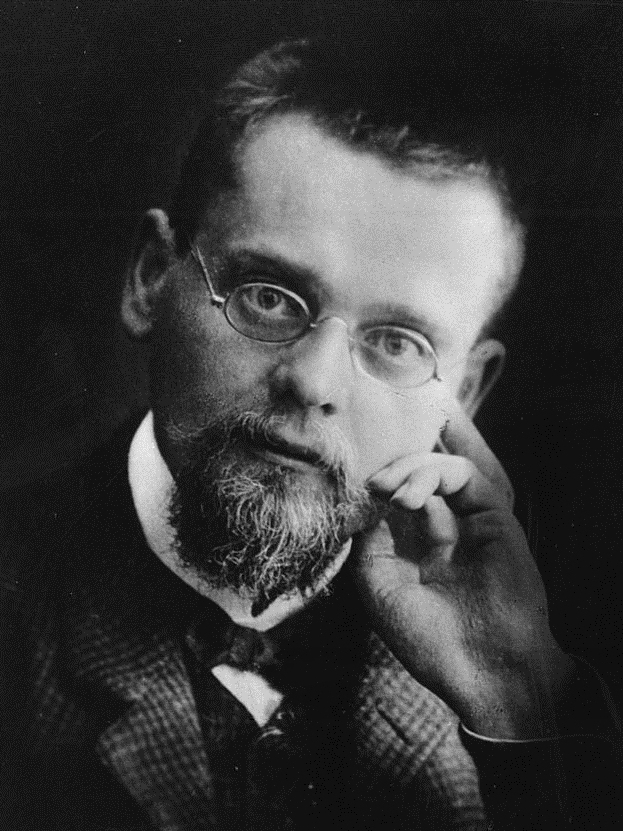
- Ernst Zermelo in the 1900s
- Born: 27 July 1871; Berlin, German Empire
- Died: 21 May 1953 (aged 81); Freiburg im Breisgau, West Germany
- Education: University of Berlin
- Known for: Zermelo ordinal; Zermelo set theory; Zermelo's categoricity theorem; Zermelo's navigation problem; Zermelo's theorem; Zermelo's theorem (game theory); Zermelo–Fraenkel set theory; Choice function; Infinitary logic; Roster notation
- Spouse: Gertrud Seekamp (1944 – death)
- Awards: Ackermann–Teubner Memorial Award (1916)
- Scientific career
- Fields: Mathematics
- Workplaces: University of Zürich
- Doctoral advisor: Lazarus Fuchs; Hermann Schwarz
- Doctoral students: Stefan Straszewicz

Ernst Friedrich Ferdinand Zermelo (/zɛərˈmɛloʊ/; German: [tsɛɐ̯ˈmeːlo]; 27 July 1871 – 21 May 1953) was a German logician and mathematician, whose work has major implications for the foundations of mathematics. He is known for his role in developing Zermelo–Fraenkel axiomatic set theory and his proof of the well-ordering theorem. Furthermore, his 1929 work on ranking chess players is the first description of a model for pairwise comparison that continues to have a profound impact on various applied fields utilizing this method.

== Life ==
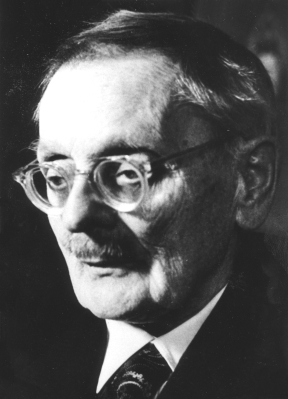
Ernst Zermelo in Freiburg (1953)

Ernst Zermelo graduated from Berlin's Luisenstädtisches Gymnasium (now Heinrich-Schliemann-Oberschule) in 1889. He then studied mathematics, physics and philosophy at the University of Berlin, the University of Halle, and the University of Freiburg. He finished his doctorate in 1894 at the University of Berlin, awarded for a dissertation on the calculus of variations (Untersuchungen zur Variationsrechnung). Zermelo remained at the University of Berlin, where he was appointed assistant to Planck, under whose guidance he began to study hydrodynamics. In 1897, Zermelo went to the University of Göttingen, at that time the leading centre for mathematical research in the world, where he completed his habilitation thesis in 1899.

In 1910, Zermelo left Göttingen upon being appointed to the chair of mathematics at the University of Zurich, which he resigned in 1916. He was appointed to an honorary chair at the University of Freiburg in 1926, which he resigned in 1935 because he disapproved of Adolf Hitler's regime. At the end of World War II and at his request, Zermelo was reinstated to his honorary position in Freiburg.

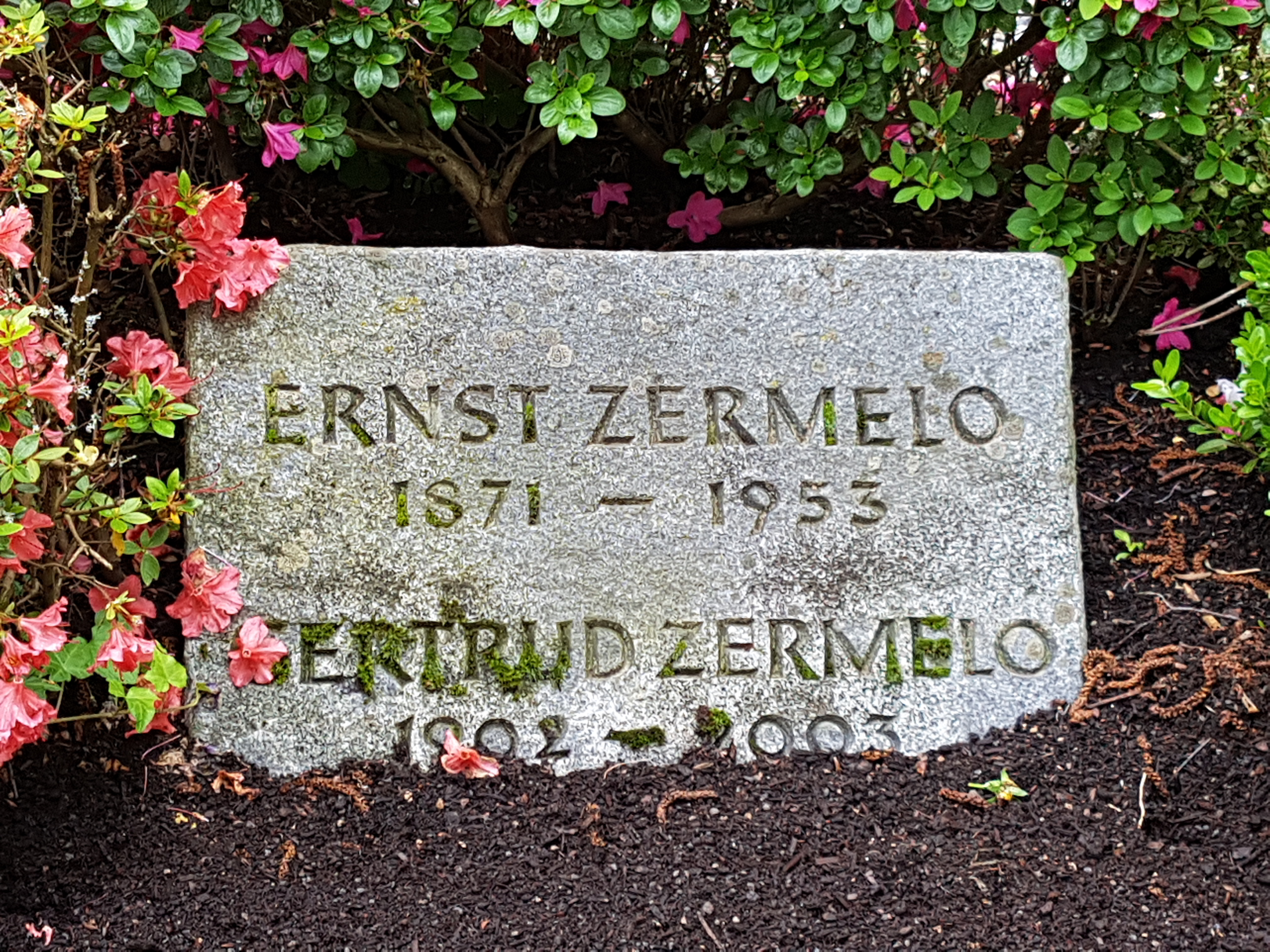
Ernst Zermelo tombstone in Friedhof Günterstal, in Günterstal district of Freiburg im Breisgau

== Research in set theory ==
In 1900, in the Paris conference of the International Congress of Mathematicians, David Hilbert challenged the mathematical community with his famous Hilbert's problems, a list of 23 unsolved fundamental questions which mathematicians should attack during the coming century. The first of these, a problem of set theory, was the continuum hypothesis introduced by Cantor in 1878, and in the course of its statement Hilbert also mentioned the need to prove the well-ordering theorem.

Zermelo began to work on the problems of set theory under Hilbert's influence and in 1902 published his first work concerning the addition of transfinite cardinals. By that time he had also discovered the so-called Russell paradox as evidenced by Husserl’s Nachlass. In 1904, he succeeded in taking the first step suggested by Hilbert towards the continuum hypothesis when he proved the well-ordering theorem (every set can be well ordered). This result brought fame to Zermelo, who was appointed Professor in Göttingen, in 1905. His proof of the well-ordering theorem, based on the powerset axiom and the axiom of choice, was not accepted by all mathematicians, mostly because the axiom of choice was a paradigm of non-constructive mathematics. In 1908, Zermelo succeeded in producing an improved proof making use of Dedekind's notion of the "chain" of a set, which became more widely accepted; this was mainly because that same year he also offered an axiomatization of set theory.

Zermelo began to axiomatize set theory in 1905; in 1908, he published his results despite his failure to prove the consistency of his axiomatic system. See the article on Zermelo set theory for an outline of this paper, together with the original axioms, and the original numbering.

In 1922, Abraham Fraenkel and Thoralf Skolem independently expanded Zermelo's axiom system, adding the axioms of replacement and regularity. The resulting system, now called Zermelo–Fraenkel axioms (ZF), is now the most commonly used system for axiomatic set theory.

== Zermelo's navigation problem ==
Proposed in 1931, Zermelo's navigation problem is a classic optimal control problem. The problem deals with a boat navigating on a body of water, originating from a point O to a destination point D. The boat is capable of a certain maximum speed, and we want to derive the best possible control to reach D in the least possible time.

Without considering external forces such as current and wind, the optimal control is for the boat to always head towards D. Its path then is a line segment from O to D, which is trivially optimal. With consideration of current and wind, if the combined force applied to the boat is non-zero, the control for no current and wind does not yield the optimal path.

== Publications ==
- Zermelo, Ernst (2013), Ebbinghaus, Heinz-Dieter; Fraser, Craig G.; Kanamori, Akihiro (eds.), Ernst Zermelo—collected works. Vol. I. Set theory, miscellanea, Schriften der Mathematisch-Naturwissenschaftlichen Klasse der Heidelberger Akademie der Wissenschaften, vol. 21, Berlin: Springer-Verlag, doi:10.1007/978-3-540-79384-7, ISBN 978-3-540-79383-0, MR 2640544
- Zermelo, Ernst (2013), Ebbinghaus, Heinz-Dieter; Kanamori, Akihiro (eds.), Ernst Zermelo—collected works. Vol. II. Calculus of variations, applied mathematics, and physics, Schriften der Mathematisch-Naturwissenschaftlichen Klasse der Heidelberger Akademie der Wissenschaften, vol. 23, Berlin: Springer-Verlag, doi:10.1007/978-3-540-70856-8, ISBN 978-3-540-70855-1, MR 3137671
- Jean van Heijenoort, 1967. From Frege to Gödel: A Source Book in Mathematical Logic, 1879–1931. Harvard Univ. Press.
  - 1904. "Proof that every set can be well-ordered," 139−41.
  - 1908. "A new proof of the possibility of well-ordering," 183–98.
  - 1908. "Investigations in the foundations of set theory I," 199–215.
- 1913. "On an Application of Set Theory to the Theory of the Game of Chess" in Rasmusen E., ed., 2001. Readings in Games and Information, Wiley-Blackwell: 79–82.
- 1930. "On boundary numbers and domains of sets: new investigations in the foundations of set theory" in Ewald, William B., ed., 1996. From Kant to Hilbert: A Source Book in the Foundations of Mathematics, 2 vols. Oxford University Press: 1219–33.

Works by others:

- Zermelo's Axiom of Choice, Its Origins, Development, & Influence, Gregory H. Moore, being Volume 8 of Studies in the History of Mathematics and Physical Sciences, Springer Verlag, New York, 1982.

== See also ==
- Axiom of choice
- Axiom of constructibility
- Axiom of extensionality
- Axiom of infinity
- Axiom of limitation of size
- Axiom of pairing
- Axiom of union
- Axiom schema of specification
- Boltzmann brain
- Choice function
- Cumulative hierarchy
- Pairwise comparison
- Von Neumann universe
- 14990 Zermelo, asteroid
