= Order and Chaos =

Tic-tac-toe variant

Order and Chaos is a variant of the game tic-tac-toe on a 6×6 gameboard. It was invented by Stephen Sniderman and introduced by him in Games magazine in 1981. The player Order strives to create a five-in-a-row of either Xs or Os. The opponent Chaos endeavors to prevent this.

== Game rules ==
Unlike typical board games, both players control both sets of pieces (Xs and Os). The game starts with the board empty. Order plays first, then turns alternate. On each turn, a player places either an X or an O on any open square. Once played, pieces cannot be moved, thus Order and Chaos can be played using pencil and paper.

Order aims to get five like pieces in a row either vertically, horizontally, or diagonally. Chaos aims to fill the board without completion of a line of five like pieces.

=== Rules addition ===
The original rules in Games magazine implied that six-in-a-row also wins. That version of the game was claimed weakly solved as a forced win for Order. The inventor has subsequently suggested a new rule to better balance winning chances for both sides: Six-in-a-row does not qualify as a win. The new rule offers Chaos new defensive tactics against Order's previously "unstoppable" four-in-a-rows. This version is weakly solved as a forced win for Chaos, who can win using a Pairing strategy.

== See also ==
- Entropy (board game)
