= Wild tic-tac-toe =

Paper and pencil game

A completed game of Wild Tic-Tac-Toe

Wild tic-tac-toe is an impartial game similar to tic-tac-toe. However, in this game players can choose to place either X or O on each move. This game can also be played in its misere form where if a player creates a three-in-a-row of marks, that player loses the game.

== Regular game ==
Wild tic-tac-toe is played on a 3-by-3 board by two players, who take turns placing an X or an O on any unoccupied square. The player who completes a straight or diagonal line of 3 X's or 3 O’s wins. In this version of the game, the player which makes the first move can always win.

== Misere game ==
This game is exactly like the regular version of the game except the player who creates a line of any three marks (Xs or Os) in a row loses the game.

The second player can force a draw by playing a mark opposite of the opponent's mark and choosing X if the opponent chose O (or vice versa).

== See also ==
- Tic-tac-toe variants
