= Pentago =

Board game

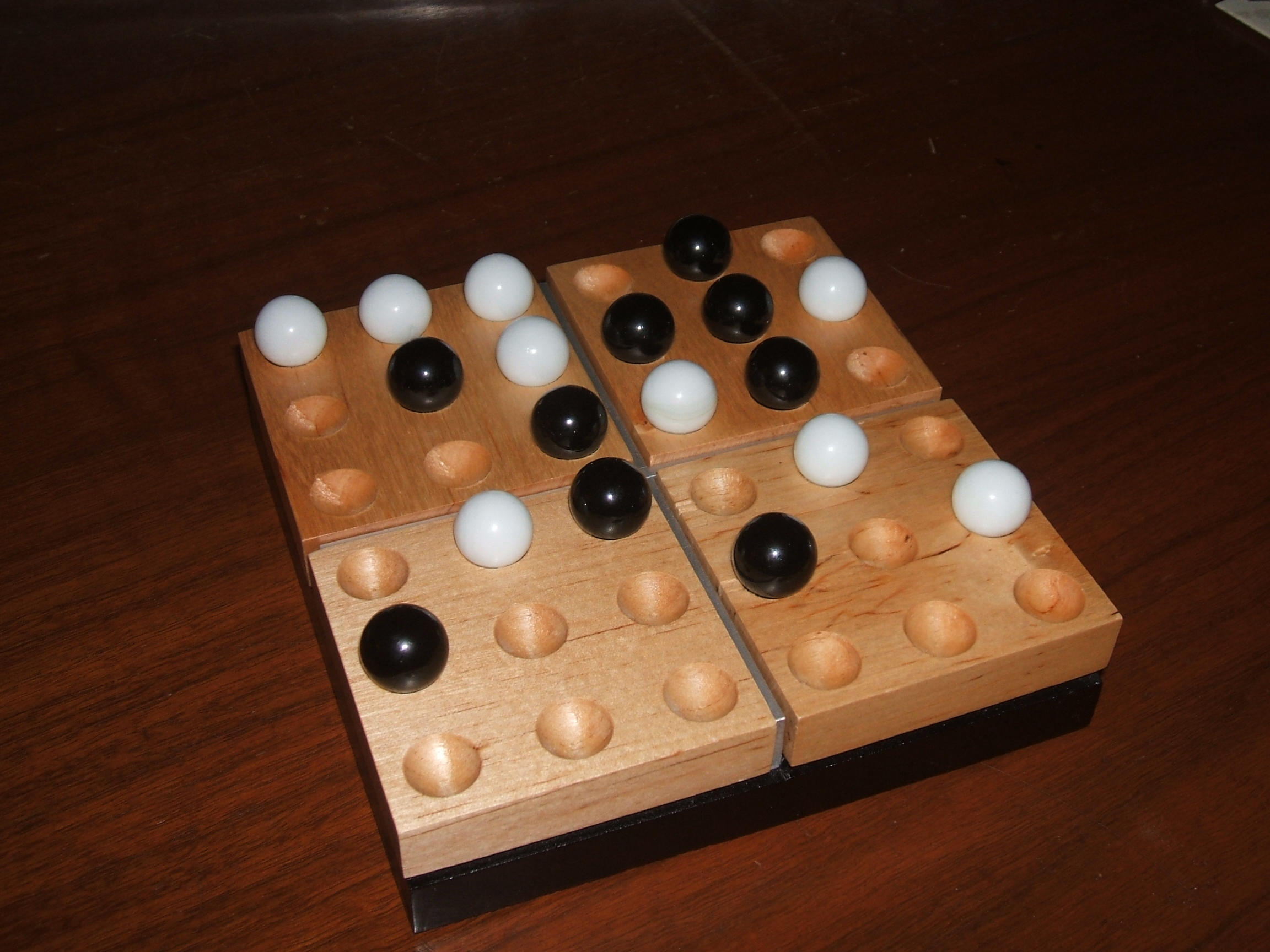
Pentago Winning Position for White

Pentago is a two-player abstract strategy game invented by Tomas Flodén.

The game is played on a 6×6 board divided into four 3×3 sub-boards (or quadrants). Taking turns, the two players place a marble of their color (either black or white) onto an unoccupied space on the board, and then rotate one of the sub-boards by 90 degrees either clockwise or anti-clockwise. This is optional at the beginning of the game, up until every sub-board no longer has rotational symmetry, at which point it becomes mandatory (this is because until then, a player could rotate an empty sub-board or one with just a marble in the middle, either of which has no real effect). A player wins by getting five of their marbles in a vertical, horizontal, or diagonal row (either before or after the sub-board rotation in their move). If all 36 spaces on the board are occupied without a row of five being formed then the game is a draw.

There is also a 3-4 player version called Pentago XL. The board is made of 9 3×3 boards, and there are 4 colours (red, yellow, green and blue) instead of the basic 2.

MindtwisterUSA has the rights of developing and commercializing the product in North America.

The 6×6 version of Pentago has been strongly solved with the help of a Cray supercomputer at NERSC. With symmetries removed, there are 3,009,081,623,421,558 possible positions. If both sides play perfectly, the first player to move will always win the game.

== Awards ==
- Game of the Year 2005 in Sweden
- Game of the Year 2006 in France
- Award winner in Mensa Mind Games 2006 Review

So far Pentago has won 8 major awards, lastly Game of the Year 2007, by Creative Child Magazine.
