= Score four =

Board game

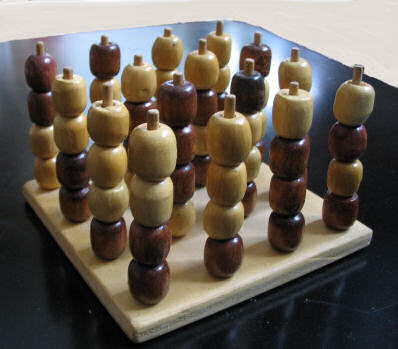
A handmade score four game

Score four is a "three dimensional" abstract strategy game, similar to Connect Four (Milton Bradley, 1974). It was first sold under the name "Score Four" by Funtastic in 1968. Lakeside issued 4 different versions in the 1970s. Later Hasbro sold the game as "Connect Four Advanced" in the UK.

The object of score four is to position four beads of the same color in a straight line on any level or any angle. As in Tic Tac Toe, Score Four strategy centers around forcing a win by making multiple threats simultaneously, while preventing the opponent from doing so.

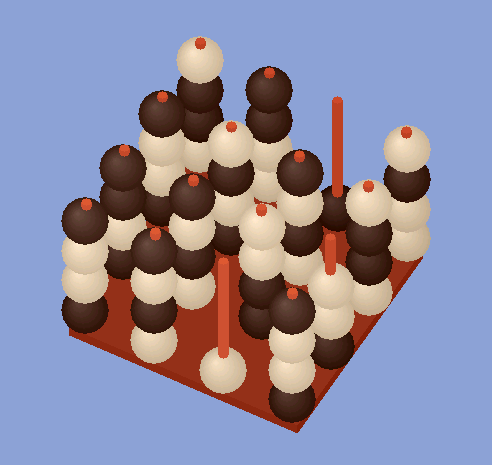
Endgame in score four. Black to move. Game will end with a win for him due to Zugzwang.

== Tic stac toe ==
The game has also been introduced as "tic stac toe", but with the introduction of a blocker piece for each side. In the game of Tic Stac Toe, on a player's turn, he or she may place a blocker piece to defend a threat of the opponent, before placing one of his or her own pieces. The blocker piece is of neutral color and cannot complete a winning line.

== Reception ==
Games magazine included Score Four in their "Top 100 Games of 1980", noting that it "takes games of tic-tac-toe into the third dimension with its 4 x 4 x 4 playing board".

Games magazine included Score Four in their "Top 100 Games of 1982", noting that "Strategy is complicated by the fact that beads cannot be played on the top levels until the columns below have been filled in".

== See also ==
- Connect 4x4
- Qubic
- Quarto (board game)
