= Connect 4x4 =

Board game

- Connect 4x4 logo
- Publishers: Milton Bradley
- Publication: 2009
- Genres: Abstract strategy
- Players: 2–4
- Setup time: 2 minutes
- Playing time: 10 minutes
- Chance: None
- Age range: 8 and up

Connect 4x4 (spoken as Connect Four by Four) is a three-dimensional-thinking strategy game first released in 2009 by Milton Bradley. The goal of the game is identical to that of its predecessor, Connect Four. Players take turns placing game pieces in the grid-like, vertically suspended playing field until one player has four of their color lined up horizontally, vertically, or diagonally. Unlike its predecessor, Connect 4x4 uses a double grid, two different types of game pieces, and can be played by up to four people at once.

== Gameplay ==
Before the game begins, each player chooses a set of checkers (brightly colored disks) and sets them aside. The game pieces come in two forms: regular checkers with holes in the center of them and "blockers" which are two discs joined in the center by a small bar. The gameboard is seven spaces wide, six spaces high, and two spaces deep and sits upright so that pieces can be dropped through openings in the top.

As each player takes a turn, they choose which type of checker to use and place it in the opening at the top. The game piece will then slide straight down until it reaches the first unoccupied space within that column.

== Strategy ==
During each move, a player decides at what location to place a checker. Each choice should be based on trying to line up one's own checkers while at the same time trying to prevent opponents from lining up their checkers first. Along with regular checkers that take up a single slot on either side of the double grid, each player has two blockers which take up both sides at once. Because the blocker is connected by a rigid bar, it will stop at the higher open slot between the two sides. This can potentially take multiple slots of a single column on one side of the board out of play for all players even though they remain unoccupied by game pieces.

== Winning the game ==
The game is won by the first player who lines up four of his or her checkers in any direction: horizontally, vertically, or diagonally. Checkers can weave back and forth between the two grids as well which increases the number of ways to place four in a row.

== See also ==
- Qubic
- Score Four
- List of abstract strategy games
