= Superghost (game) =

Two-player paper-and-pencil word game

Superghost is a paper and pencil word game for two players. A letter is written on a sheet of paper, and each player takes turns adding a letter either to the beginning or the end of this ever-growing word stem. Any word-stem a player creates must form part of a valid English word, without actually being a word itself. The first player to create a word (with at least three or four letters) loses. It is similar to the game of Ghost, where players only add letters to the end of a word.

The game can be played with paper and pencil or simply spoken aloud. The game was played by James Thurber and his circle of friends.

Some online sites call the game "Lexicant."

== Bluffing and challenging ==
At any turn a player is expected to have one or more "reserve words" in mind which could be formed from the exact word-stem in play. If the letters in play were "MICAB", for example, valid reserve words would include "AMICABLE" and "AMICABILITY". However, a player can opt to bluff on their turn - that is, they can add a letter to the word-stem without actually having a reserve word in mind. Bluffing is almost always done as a last resort, though some players may use bluffs strategically to force their opponents into untenable positions. If a player feels their opponent has played a bluff and has no reserve word in mind, they may lodge a challenge at any time before the next turn is played. The recipient of the challenge must then provide a valid reserve word which contains the word-stem in play. If they are able to do so, the challenged player wins the game. If they can not provide a reserve word, the challenger wins the game.

== Strategy ==
Superghost requires a strong vocabulary, but that alone is not generally enough to truly master the game. Familiarity with commonly used suffixes, prefixes, and Pluralization is a must, as these can be used to extend word-stems into larger and larger formations before a word must finally be created. But simply extending the length of a word won't guarantee a win. A player must also employ simple strategies to ensure that the final word contains the proper number of letters required for them to win: an even number if they made the first move, or an odd number if they played the second move.

== Example games ==
Two example games could be played as follows:

Example 1	Example 2
A AT ATI PATI IPATI IPATIO CIPATIO ICIPATIO TICIPATIO NTICIPATIO NTICIPATION NTICIPATIONS ANTICIPATIONS	V IV TIV ITIV SITIV NSITIV NSITIVI NSITIVIT ENSITIVIT ENSITIVITI ENSITIVITIE SENSITIVITIE RSENSITIVITIE RSENSITIVITIES ERSENSITIVITIES PERSENSITIVITIES YPERSENSITIVITIES HYPERSENSITIVITIES

In Example 1, it can be noted that the phrase "AT" does not end the game; this is because words only become valid once they are at least three letters long.
