= Treblecross =

Degenerate tic-tac toe variant

A completed game of Treblecross

Treblecross is a degenerate tic-tac toe variant. The game is an octal game, played on a one-dimensional board and both players play using the same piece (an X or a black chip). Each player on their turn plays a piece in an unoccupied space. The game is won if a player on their turn makes a line of three pieces (Xs or black chips) in a row.

== Gameplay ==
The game begins with all the 1×n spaces empty. Each player plays an X on the one-dimensional board in an empty cell. The game is won when a player makes a row of three Xs.

== See also ==
- n^{d} game – Generalization of the game Tic-tac-toe to higher dimensions
