= Maharajah and the Sepoys =

Variant of chess

Maharajah and the Sepoys

	a	b	c	d	e	f	g	h
8	a8 black rook	b8 black knight	c8 black bishop	d8 black queen	e8 black king	f8 black bishop	g8 black knight	h8 black rook	8
7	a7 black pawn	b7 black pawn	c7 black pawn	d7 black pawn	e7 black pawn	f7 black pawn	g7 black pawn	h7 black pawn	7
6	a6	b6	c6	d6	e6	f6	g6	h6	6
5	a5	b5	c5	d5	e5	f5	g5	h5	5
4	a4	b4	c4	d4	e4	f4	g4	h4	4
3	a3	b3	c3	d3	e3	f3	g3	h3	3
2	a2	b2	c2	d2	e2	f2	g2	h2	2
1	a1	b1	c1	d1	e1 A l	f1	g1	h1	1
	a	b	c	d	e	f	g	h

Starting position. The white figure is a maharajah; it can move as queen or knight.

Maharajah and the Sepoys, originally called Shatranj Diwana Shah and also known as the Mad King's Game, Maharajah chess, or Sarvatobhadra ("auspicious on all sides"), is a popular chess variant with different armies for White and Black. Its modern form was first played in the 19th century in India. It is a solved game with a forced win for Black.

== Game rules ==
Black has a full, standard chess army ("sepoys") in the usual position. White is limited to a single piece starting on e1, the maharajah, which can move as either a queen or as a knight on White's turn (analogous to the amazon fairy chess piece). Black's goal is to checkmate the maharajah, while White's is to checkmate Black's king. There is no promotion.

== Strategy ==
The asymmetry of the game pits movement flexibility and agility against greater force in numbers. By perfect play, Black always wins in this game, at least on an 8×8 board. According to Hans Bodlaender, "A carefully playing black player should be able to win. However, this is not always easy, and in many cases, when the white 'Maharaja' breaks through the lines of black, he has good chances to win."

The maharajah can pose a serious threat and even win against a weak opponent. Its strategy is to clean as many black pieces as possible in the early game using forks (attacking more than one unprotected piece at once) as the main tactic; after sufficiently cleaning the board, it should use checks to chase the black king away from its other pieces, drive it to an edge of the board and give checkmate.

The maharajah's critical weakness is that as a royal, it cannot do exchanges, meaning it cannot capture black pieces that are protected. Thus, the Sepoys' winning strategy is to make moves in such a way that all their pieces stay protected while gradually taking away available squares from the maharajah.

	a	b	c	d	e	f	g	h
8	a8	b8	c8	d8	e8	f8	g8 black king	h8	8
7	a7	b7 black pawn	c7 black pawn	d7	e7 black bishop	f7 black pawn	g7	h7 black knight	7
6	a6	b6	c6 black knight	d6	e6	f6	g6	h6	6
5	a5 black pawn	b5	c5	d5 black pawn	e5	f5	g5 black pawn	h5 black pawn	5
4	a4	b4	c4	d4 black queen	e4 black pawn	f4	g4 black bishop	h4	4
3	a3	b3	c3	d3	e3	f3	g3	h3	3
2	a2	b2 black rook	c2 A l	d2	e2	f2	g2	h2	2
1	a1	b1 black rook	c1	d1	e1	f1	g1	h1	1
	a	b	c	d	e	f	g	h

Final position after 24...R3b2#

One example line of moves that gives Black a forced mate in 24 moves goes like the following (White's moves are unimportant, as, in this variation, White cannot legally capture any piece or be stalemated):

1... d5 2... Nc6 3... Qd6 4... e5 5... Nf6 6... a5 7... Ra6 8... Rb6 9... Bg4 10... e4 11... Qe5 12... Be7 13... 0-0 14... Rb2 15... Ra8 16... Ra6 17... Rab6 18... R6b3 19... h5 20... g5 21... Nh7 22... Qd4

Now, if the maharajah is on a1, then:

23... Rb1 24... R3b2# (diagram) 0–1

Else:

23... Qd1# 0–1

== History ==
Descriptions of this chess variant can be traced as far back as the 12th century in the Mānasollāsa, which refers to the game as sarvatobhadra (Sanskrit: सर्वतोभद्र, lit. 'auspicious on all sides'). It is a variant of chaturanga that is determined by each player throwing two or so dice. Supposedly, the multiple dice were used to expand the rolling player's possible choices. The values on each die correspond to which types of pieces to be moved; the player with the Maharajah is forced to move it like a piece as indicated by the dice.

The chaturanga variant was revived by the 1871 Indian encyclopedia of games Kridakaushalya, which revised it using the moves of modern chess pieces. It was first described in the Western world in 1892 by Edward Falkener, who called it "The Maharajah and the Sepoys".

== See also ==
- Manchu chess
