= Mojo (board game) =

- Designers: Martin H. Samuel
- Illustrators: Martin H. Samuel
- Publishers: Games Above Board
- Players: 2
- Setup time: 1 minute
- Playing time: 25 minutes
- Age range: 10 and up
- Skills: Tactics, strategy, concentration

Mojo is a two-player, 3 in-a-row abstract strategy board game played with original and unique "thrice-sliced-dice". The pieces, handmade to order in India, are colored with non-toxic vegetable dye. The individual opposite ends of the pieces are marked with pips and numbered similar to regular dice - i.e. they total 7. It takes all 3 pieces of a color to make up a single die.

The game was designed by Martin H. Samuel, published in 2006 by Games Above Board and launched at that year's Spiel game fair in Germany.

The game is played with a 3×3 game board, 3 green and 3 red playing pieces, 1 green, 1 red and 1 neutral color pawn, and a pencil and paper for scoring.

A variation, Pocket Mojo, is a travel version played with similar but smaller components.

== Objective ==
Mojo and Mojo Too are pure strategy variations of the game. The goal of the game is to have three own-color pieces on the board in a horizontal, vertical or diagonal row.

Mojo 2 is played for points using luck and strategy. The goal is to have three own-color pieces in a horizontal, vertical or diagonal row and score the most points.

== Gameplay ==
The Mojo game board has a grid of horizontal, vertical and diagonal lines joining 9 marked playing piece positions. Players choose either green or red and use 3 same-color pieces each. The 3 pawns are placed in the bag and the first player to draw their color from the bag starts.

Mojo is played with 3 pieces each and a single neutral pawn, used as a blocker, that is common to and may be moved by both players. The game starts with the pawn in the center of the board and during play, there is a choice of 2 empty spaces. Players take turns placing their 3 pieces on the board, one at a time, on any empty position, building on those already on the board, to complete and/or block winning rows. Then, continue by moving any piece (including the opponent's) or the pawn to an adjacent empty space. Players may move the pawn. Pieces and pawns may not jump over each other and the last piece or pawn moved may not be returned to its previous position. The game is over when a player has 3 same-color pieces in a row - horizontally, vertically or diagonally and is then the winner of the game.

Mojo Too is similar in principle and played with 3 pieces and 1 pawn each. Starting with an empty board, players take turns placing their 3 pieces then 1 pawn, one at a time, on any empty position on the board. Then, continue by moving any piece (including the opponent's) or their pawn to the 1 adjacent empty space - to complete and/or block winning rows. Players may only move their own pawn. Pieces and pawns may not jump over each other and the last piece or pawn moved may not be returned to its previous position. The game is over when a player has 3 same-color pieces in a row - horizontally, vertically or diagonally and is then the winner.

Mojo 2 is similar in principle and played as Mojo and Mojo Too for points. The playing pieces, with numbered opposite ends, are placed on the board either end up and always inverted when moved, thereby constantly changing the score. The game may be played for a certain number of rounds or to an agreed points total.

The round is over when a player has 3 same-color pieces in a row - horizontally, vertically or diagonally. The pips on the tops of the pieces in a winning row are added up and the first to reach the set score is the winner of the game. In this way, the best of 5 rounds may be 2 - on points.

== See also ==
- List of abstract strategy games
- Tic-tac-toe Variations
