= Toss Across =

Game similar to tic-tac-toe

A modern board. X has won this game.

Toss Across is a game first introduced in 1969 by the now defunct Ideal Toy Company. The game was designed by Marvin Glass and Associates and created by Hank Kramer, Larry Reiner and Walter Moe, and is now distributed by Mattel. It is a game where participants play tic-tac-toe by lobbing small beanbags at targets in an attempt to change the targets to their desired letter. As in traditional tic-tac-toe, the first player to get three of their letters in a row wins the game. There are other similar games to Toss Across known under different names, like Tic Tac Throw.

The targets are three-sided blocks situated on a frame such that the impact of the beanbags can turn the block, changing the letter. Each block has a blank side, an X, and an O. Modern boards are entirely plastic, less than a meter square. Six beanbags are included with the game.

== Rules ==
The official rules as included with the game call for the X player to go first. Each player starts with three beanbags. Players stand approximately six feet from the board to toss their beanbags, alternating turns. The beanbags are only retrieved after all six are thrown. Whenever three matching symbols in a row are turned over by either player, the game ends immediately.

Multiple players may participate by dividing into two teams. (Turn order: 1. Player 1 from Team A, 2. Player 1 from Team B, 3. Player 2 from Team A, 4. Player 2 from Team B.)

Variations:

1. More skilled players can stand further back to make aiming their tosses more challenging.
2. Rather than arbitrarily assigning the first player X, letters can be assigned as soon as a letter is turned on the board, to the player that turned it. For example, if the first player misses his first shot, but the second player turns over an X, the second player is assigned X (and by extension, the first player subsequently plays O) for the remainder of the game.

== Luck versus skill ==
The beanbags used in the game.

The strength of Toss Across is its balance between luck and skill. While the game generally rewards accurate tossing and effective strategy, there are elements of luck to the game. Even if a player succeeds in hitting the square they wish to change, it is often impossible to control the effect one's beanbag impact will have. Blocks may turn quickly, spinning a few times before coming to rest, at which point any side may be facing up. Players can be frustrated by hitting the square they want, only to change it to their opponent's letter. Furthermore, the low quality of the plastic board can punish players. Blocks do not always turn, even when impacted.

Occasionally a beanbag toss can affect two (or in rare cases, more) squares simultaneously. Skillful players can attempt to do this on purpose, but more often it happens without intent.

With practice, players can become increasingly adept at hitting the precise location on the board that they wish, enabling them a better chance of affecting the square they want to change.

In the original 1969 edition of the game, the pieces in the squares did not turn freely, but could instead only turn one face in either direction from neutral. This is why the neutral squares had small X and O decals on them; if you hit the small X, the square would turn to X and stop. To turn it off of X, a bag had to strike the other half of the square. It might then turn back to neutral, or to O. The original game had a much stronger emphasis on skill than the current version.

== Strategy ==
Unlike traditional tic-tac-toe, a letter placed in a given square may not stay there the rest of the game. A square may change letters multiple times before the game is resolved. This highlights the major game strategy that it is often more effective to attempt to remove opponents' letters than to block them from getting three in a row. In traditional tic-tac-toe, preventing a player from getting three letters in a row is accomplished by placing your symbol in the way such that they cannot get three in a row in a given direction. While this is entirely possible in Toss Across, the somewhat arbitrary effect of hitting a square can work against players.

For example: Joe (playing O) observes that Jane (playing X) has changed both bottom corner squares to X. In traditional tic-tac-toe, Joe would place an O in the bottom center square to block her. However, in Toss Across, unless Joe is confident he can control his throw to the degree that hitting the bottom center block will definitely change it to an O, this is not the best move. There is a 1-in-3 chance that hitting the block will change it to X, giving Jane the victory. Moreover, even if Joe achieves his best possible outcome and changes the block to O, Jane will still aim for this block to change it to X. Joe's move is essentially wasted. Instead, Joe aims for one of Jane's established corners. If he hits it, there is a 2-in-3 chance that he will remove the X from the board, and he even has a 1-in-3 chance to flip the square to O, radically altering Jane's strategy.

While no method of tossing the beanbag is guaranteed to have the desired effect, tossing the bag vertically (such that it rotates corner over corner) rather than horizontally (such that it stays mostly flat) tends to create more significant impacts and more often turns the blocks.

Although no official rules prevent overhand tossing, some players ban this practice merely to prevent high-power throws at the board, which is not particularly sturdy.

== See also ==
- Cornhole
