= Number Scrabble =

Mathematical game

Number Scrabble (also known as Pick15 or 3 to 15) is a mathematical game where players take turns to select numbers from 1 to 9 without repeating any numbers previously used, and the first player with a sum of exactly 15 using any three of their number selections wins the game. The game is isomorphic to tic-tac-toe, as can be seen if the game is mapped onto a magic square.

== Play ==
A 3x3 magic square of the numbers 1 through 9

Number Scrabble is played with the list of numbers between 1 and 9. Each player takes turns picking a number from the list. Once a number has been picked, it cannot be picked again. If a player has picked three numbers that add up to 15, that player wins the game. However, if all the numbers are used and no player gets exactly 15, the game is a draw.

The game is identical to tic-tac-toe, as can be seen by reference to a 3x3 magic square: if a player has selected three numbers which can be found in a line on a magic square, they will add up to 15. If they have selected any other three numbers, they will not.

== Example ==
As an example game between player A and player B:

1. A picks 9.
2. B picks 8.
3. A picks 2.
4. B has no choice but to pick 4 (otherwise, A could get 9+2+4=15).
5. A has no choice but to pick 3 (otherwise, B could get 8+4+3=15).
6. B picks 6, and thereby threatens to win by either picking 1 (8+6+1=15) or 5 (4+6+5=15).
7. At this point, A has lost because the second pick (2) was a mistake, A should not pick 1, 2, 3, or 7 as second pick, or A must lose.
