= Nd game =

Generalization of the game Tic-tac-toe to higher dimensions

A n^{d} game (or n^{k} game) is a generalization of the combinatorial game tic-tac-toe to higher dimensions. It is a game played on a n^{d} hypercube with 2 players. If one player creates a line of length n of their symbol (X or O) they win the game. However, if all n^{d} spaces are filled then the game is a draw. Tic-tac-toe is the game where n equals 3 and d equals 2 (3, 2). Qubic is the (4, 3) game. The (n > 0, 0) or (1, 1) games are trivially won by the first player as there is only one space (n^{0} = 1 and 1^{1} = 1). A game with d = 1 and n > 1 cannot be won if both players are playing well as an opponent's piece will block the one-dimensional line.

== Game theory ==
Unsolved problem in mathematics
Given a width of tic-tac-toe board, what is the smallest dimension such that X is guaranteed a winning strategy?
More unsolved problems in mathematics

An n^{d} game is a symmetric combinatorial game.

There are a total of $\frac{\left(n+2\right)^d-n^d}{2}$ winning lines in a n^{d} game.

For any width n, at some dimension d (thanks to the Hales-Jewett theorem), there will always be a winning strategy for player X. There will never be a winning strategy for player O because of the Strategy-stealing argument since an n^{d} game is symmetric.

== See also ==
- Treblecross – Degenerate tic-tac toe variant
