= Connect Four =

Two-player board game

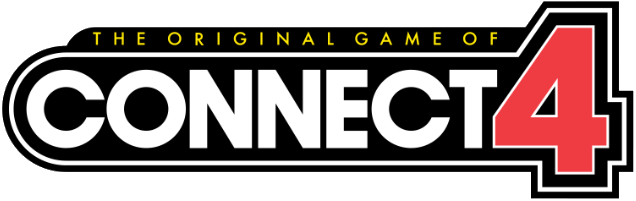

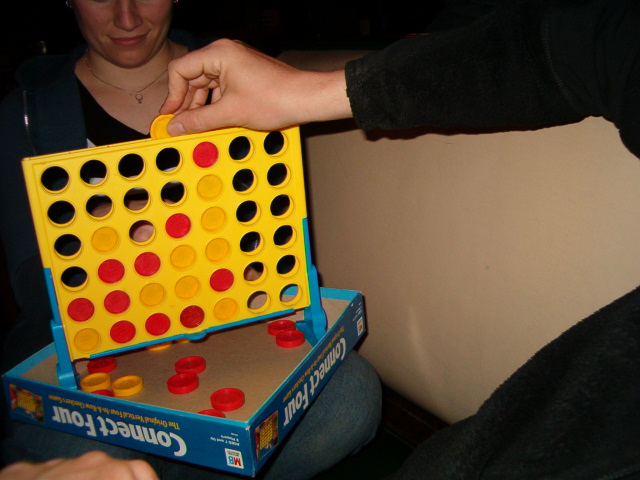
- Two people playing Connect Four
- Other names: 4 in a Row; The Captain's Duel; The Captain's Mistress
- Designers: Howard Wexler; Ned Strongin
- Publishers: Milton Bradley; Hasbro
- Publication: 1974; 52 years ago
- Years active: 1974–present
- Genres: Connection game
- Languages: English
- Players: 2
- Playing time: 10 min
- Age range: 6+
- Materials required: a playing board and tokens

Connect Four (also known as Connect 4, Four Up, Plot Four, Find Four, Captain's Mistress, Four in a Row, Drop Four, and, in the Soviet Union, Gravitrips) is a game in which the players choose a color and then take turns dropping colored tokens into a six-row, seven-column vertically suspended grid. The pieces fall straight down, occupying the lowest available space within the column. The objective of the game is to be the first to form a horizontal, vertical, or diagonal line of four of one's own tokens. It is therefore a type of m,n,k-game (7, 6, 4) with restricted piece placement. Connect Four is a solved game; the first player can always win by playing the right moves.

The game was created by Howard Wexler, and first sold under the Connect Four trademark by Milton Bradley in February 1974.

== Gameplay ==
Object: Connect four of your discs in a row while preventing your opponent from doing the same. But, look out – your opponent can sneak up on you and win the game!

— Milton Bradley, Connect Four "Pretty Sneaky, Sis" television commercial, 1977

A gameplay example (below right) shows the first player starting Connect Four by dropping one of their yellow discs into the center column of an empty game board. The two players then alternate turns dropping one of their discs at a time into an unfilled column, until the second player, with red discs, achieves a diagonal four in a row, and wins the game. If the board fills up before either player achieves four in a row, then the game is a draw.

== Mathematical solution ==
Connect Four is a two-player game with perfect information for both sides, meaning that nothing is hidden from anyone. Connect Four also belongs to the classification of an adversarial, zero-sum game, since a player's advantage is an opponent's disadvantage.

One measure of complexity of the Connect Four game is the number of possible board positions. For classic Connect Four played on a 7-column-wide, 6-row-high grid, there are 4,531,985,219,092 positions for all game boards populated with 0 to 42 pieces.

Gameplay of Connect Four

The game was first solved by James Dow Allen (October 1, 1988), and independently by Victor Allis (October 16, 1988). Allis describes a knowledge-based approach, with nine strategies, as a solution for Connect Four. Allen also describes winning strategies in his analysis of the game. At the time of the initial solutions for Connect Four, brute-force analysis was not deemed feasible given the game's complexity and the computer technology available at the time.

Connect Four has since been solved with brute-force methods, beginning with John Tromp's work in compiling an 8-ply database. The artificial intelligence algorithms able to strongly solve Connect Four are minimax or negamax, with optimizations that include alpha-beta pruning, move ordering, and transposition tables. The code for solving Connect Four with these methods is also the basis for the Fhourstones integer performance benchmark. In 2025, a win-draw-loss look-up table was computed for the classic 7x6 board.

The solved conclusion for Connect Four is first-player win. With perfect play, the first player can force a win, on or before the 41st move by starting in the middle column. The game is a theoretical draw when the first player starts in the columns adjacent to the center. For the edges of the game board, column 1 and 2 on left (or column 7 and 6 on right), the exact move-value score for first player start is loss on the 40th move, and loss on the 42nd move, respectively. In other words, by starting with the four outer columns, the first player allows the second player to force a win.

== Rule variations ==
There are many variations of Connect Four with differing game board sizes, game pieces, and gameplay rules. Many variations are popular with game theory and artificial intelligence research, rather than with physical game boards and gameplay by persons.

The most commonly used Connect Four board size is 7 columns × 6 rows. Size variations include 5×4, 6×5, 8×7, 9×7, 10×7, 8×8, Infinite Connect-Four, and Cylinder-Infinite Connect-Four.

Several versions of Hasbro's Connect Four physical gameboard make it easy to remove game pieces from the bottom one at a time. Along with traditional gameplay, this feature allows for variations of the game. Some earlier game versions also included specially marked discs, and cardboard column extenders, for additional variations to the game.

=== PopOut ===
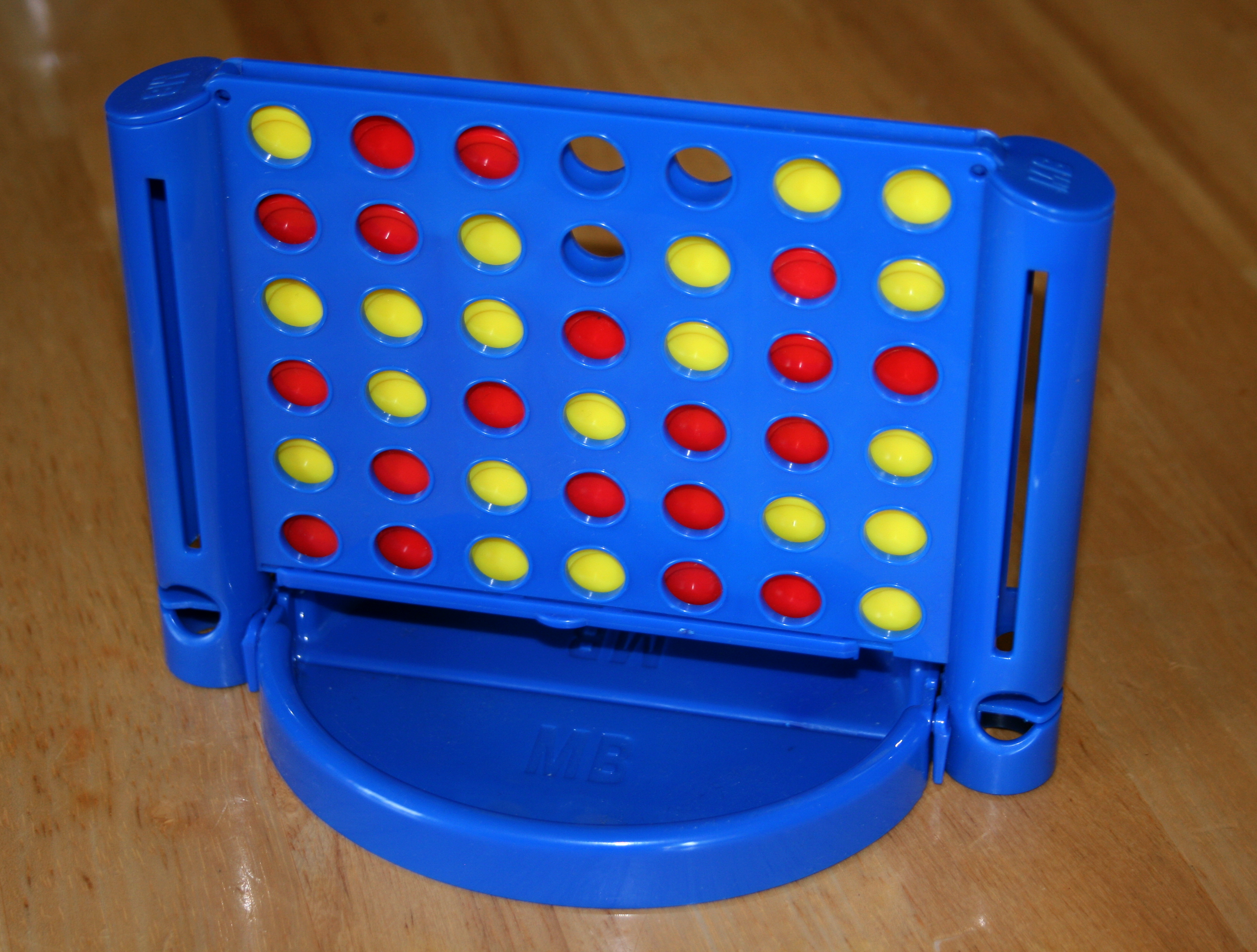
A travel version of the Milton Bradley game

PopOut starts the same as traditional gameplay, with an empty board and players alternating turns placing their own colored discs into the board. During each turn, a player can either add another disc from the top, or if one has any discs of their own color on the bottom row, remove (or "pop out") a disc of one's own color from the bottom. Popping a disc out from the bottom drops every disc above it down one space, changing their relationship with the rest of the board and changing the possibilities for a connection. The first player to connect four of their discs horizontally, vertically, or diagonally wins the game.

=== Pop 10 ===
Before play begins, Pop 10 is set up differently from the traditional game. Taking turns, each player places one of their own color discs into the slots filling up only the bottom row, then moving on to the next row until it is filled, and so forth until all rows have been filled.

Gameplay works by players taking turns removing a disc of one's own color through the bottom of the board. If the disc that was removed was part of a four-disc connection at the time of its removal, the player sets it aside out of play and immediately takes another turn. If it was not part of a "connect four", then it must be placed back on the board through a slot at the top into any open space in an alternate column (whenever possible) and the turn ends, switching to the other player. The first player to set aside ten discs of their color wins the game.

=== Five-in-a-Row ===
The Five-in-a-Row variation for Connect Four is a game played on a 6 high, 9 wide grid. Two additional board columns, already filled with player pieces in an alternating pattern, are added to the left and right sides of the standard 6-by-7 game board. The game plays similarly to the original Connect Four, except players must now get five pieces in a row to win. This is still a 42-ply game since the two new columns added to the game represent twelve game pieces already played, before the start of a game.

=== Power Up ===
In this variation of Connect Four, players begin a game with one or more specially marked "Power Checkers" game pieces, which each player may choose to play once per game. When playing a piece marked with an anvil icon, for example, the player may immediately pop out all pieces below it, leaving the anvil piece at the bottom row of the game board. Other marked game pieces include one with a wall icon, allowing a player to play a second consecutive non-winning turn with an unmarked piece; a "×2" icon, allowing for an unrestricted second turn with an unmarked piece; and a bomb icon, allowing a player to immediately pop out an opponent's piece.

== Other versions ==
Hasbro also produces various sizes of Giant Connect Four, suitable for outdoor use. The largest is built from weather-resistant wood, and measures 120 cm in both width and height. Connect Four was released for the Microvision video game console in 1979, developed by Robert Hoffberg. It was also released for the Texas Instruments 99/4 computer the same year.

With the proliferation of mobile devices, Connect Four has regained popularity as a game that can be played quickly and against another person over an Internet connection.

In 2007, Milton Bradley published Connect Four Stackers. Instead of the usual grid, the game features a board to place colored discs on. Just like standard Connect Four, the object of the game is to try get four in a row of a specific color of discs.

In 2008, another board variation Hasbro published as a physical game is Connect 4x4. This game features a two-layer vertical grid with colored discs for four players, plus blocking discs. The object of the game is also to get four in a row for a specific color of discs.

In 2013, Bay Tek Games released a Connect Four ticket redemption arcade game under license from Hasbro. There are standard and deluxe versions of the game. Two players move and drop the checkers using buttons. If only one player is playing, the player plays against the computer. Both the player that wins and the player that loses get tickets. The player that wins gets to play a bonus round where a checker is moving and the player needs to press the button at the right time to get the ticket jackpot.

In 2015, Winning Moves published Connect Four Twist & Turn. This game variant features a game tower instead of the flat game grid. The tower has five rings that twist independently. Gameplay is similar to standard Connect Four where players try to get four in a row of their own colored discs. However, with Twist & Turn, players have the choice to twist a ring after they have played a piece. It adds a subtle layer of strategy to the gameplay.

In 2018, Bay Tek Games released their second Connect Four arcade game, Connect 4 Hoops. Players throw basketballs into basketball hoops, and they show up as checkers on the video screen. The game can be played by two players, or by one player against the computer. Both the player that wins and the player that loses get tickets.

In 2018, Hasbro released Connect 4 Shots. This version requires the players to bounce coloured balls into the grid until one player achieves four in a row.

== Popular culture ==
- Broadcaster and writer Stuart Maconie—while working at the NME—started a rumour that Connect Four was invented by David Bowie, which became an urban myth.
- On The Hub's game show Family Game Night, there is a game under the name "Connect 4 Basketball" in which teams use colored balls.
- In the video game A Way Out, Vincent and Leo can play Connect Four as a minigame.

== Reviews ==
- Games and Puzzles
- Family Games: The 100 Best

== See also ==
- Gomoku (five in a line on a 15×15 Go board)
- Hex (a connection game)
- Pente (five in a line, on a 19×19 grid, with capture)
- Score four (four in a line, on a three-dimensional 4×4×4 grid)
- Teeko (four in a line or a square, on a 5×5 grid)
