= Solved game =

Game whose outcome can be correctly predicted

A solved game is a game whose outcome (win, lose or draw) can be correctly predicted from any position, assuming that both players play perfectly. This concept is usually applied to abstract strategy games, and especially to games with full information and no element of chance; solving such a game may use combinatorial game theory or computer assistance.

== Overview ==
A two-player game can be solved on several levels:

=== Ultra-weak solution ===
Prove whether the first player will win, lose or draw from the initial position, given perfect play on both sides. This can be a non-constructive proof (possibly involving a strategy-stealing argument) that need not actually determine any details of the perfect play.

=== Weak solution ===
Provide one algorithm for each of the two players, such that the player using it can achieve at least the optimal outcome, regardless of the opponent's moves, from the start of the game, using reasonable computational resources.

=== Strong solution ===
Provide an algorithm that uses reasonable computational resources and finds optimal plays for both players from all legal positions.

Despite their name, many game theorists believe that "ultra-weak" proofs are the deepest, most interesting and valuable. "Ultra-weak" proofs require a scholar to reason about the abstract properties of the game, and show how these properties lead to certain outcomes if perfect play is realized.

By contrast, "strong" proofs often proceed by brute force—using a computer to exhaustively search a game tree to figure out what would happen if perfect play were realized. The resulting proof gives an optimal strategy for every possible position on the board. However, these proofs are not as helpful in understanding deeper reasons why some games are solvable as a draw, and other, seemingly very similar games are solvable as a win.

Given the rules of any two-person game with a finite number of positions, one can always trivially construct a minimax algorithm that would exhaustively traverse the game tree. However, since for many non-trivial games such an algorithm would require an infeasible amount of time to generate a move in a given position, a game is not considered to be solved weakly or strongly unless the algorithm can be run by existing hardware in a reasonable time. Many algorithms rely on a huge pre-generated database and are effectively nothing more.

As a simple example of a strong solution, the game of tic-tac-toe is easily solvable as a draw for both players with perfect play (a result manually determinable). Games like nim also admit a rigorous analysis using combinatorial game theory.

Whether a game is solved is not necessarily the same as whether it remains interesting for humans to play. Even a strongly solved game can still be interesting if its solution is too complex to be memorized; conversely, a weakly solved game may lose its attraction if the winning strategy is simple enough to remember (e.g., Maharajah and the Sepoys). An ultra-weak solution (e.g., Chomp or Hex on a sufficiently large board) generally does not affect playability.

== Perfect play ==
In game theory, perfect play is the behavior or strategy of a player that leads to the best possible outcome for that player regardless of the response by the opponent. Perfect play for a game is known when the game is solved. Based on the rules of a game, every possible final position can be evaluated (as a win, loss or draw). By backward reasoning, one can recursively evaluate a non-final position as identical to the position that is one move away and best valued for the player whose move it is. Thus a transition between positions can never result in a better evaluation for the moving player, and a perfect move in a position would be a transition between positions that are equally evaluated. As an example, a perfect player in a drawn position would always get a draw or win, never a loss. If there are multiple options with the same outcome, perfect play is sometimes considered the fastest method leading to a good result, or the slowest method leading to a bad result.

Perfect play can be generalized to non-perfect information games, as the strategy that would guarantee the highest minimal expected outcome regardless of the strategy of the opponent. As an example, the perfect strategy for rock paper scissors would be to randomly choose each of the options with equal (1/3) probability. The disadvantage in this example is that this strategy will never exploit non-optimal strategies of the opponent, so the expected outcome of this strategy versus any strategy will always be equal to the minimal expected outcome.

Although the optimal strategy of a game may not (yet) be known, a game-playing computer might still benefit from solutions of the game from certain endgame positions (in the form of endgame tablebases), which will allow it to play perfectly after some point in the game. Computer chess programs are well known for doing this.

== Solved games ==
Awari (a game of the Mancala family)
The variant of Oware allowing game ending "grand slams" was strongly solved by Henri Bal and John Romein at the Vrije Universiteit in Amsterdam, Netherlands (2002). Either player can force the game into a draw.
Chopsticks
Strongly solved. If two players both play perfectly, the game will go on indefinitely.
Connect Four

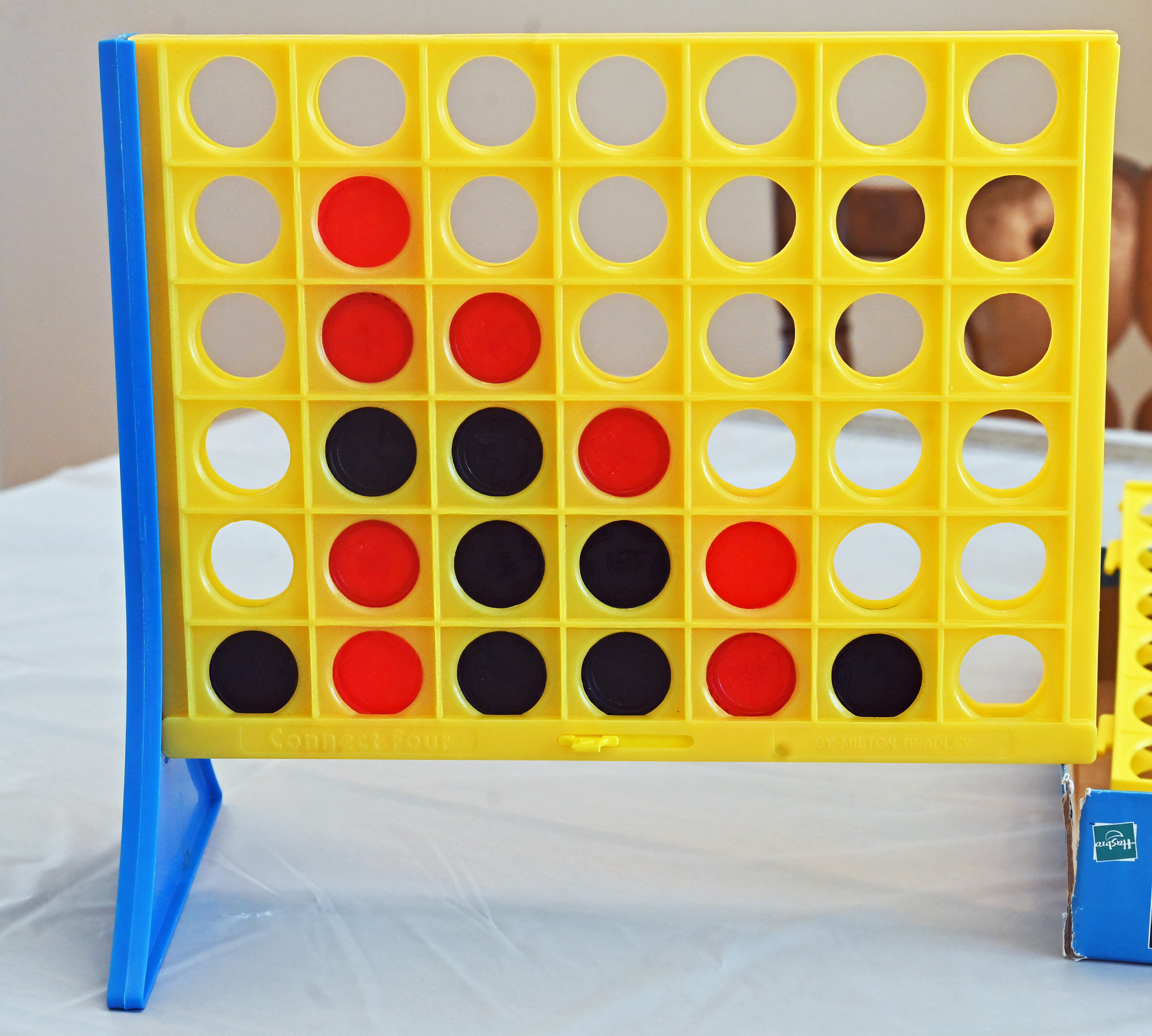
The game of Connect Four has been solved.

Solved first by James D. Allen on October 1, 1988, and independently by Victor Allis on October 16, 1988. The first player can force a win. Strongly solved by John Tromp's 8-ply database (Feb 4, 1995). Weakly solved for all boardsizes where width+height is at most 15 (as well as 8×8 in late 2015) (Feb 18, 2006). Solved for all boardsizes where width+height equals 16 on May 22, 2024. In 2025, the classic 7x6 board was strongly solved in terms of a win-draw-loss look-up table.
Free gomoku
Solved by Victor Allis (1993). The first player can force a win without opening rules.
Ghost
Solved by Alan Frank using the Official Scrabble Players Dictionary in 1987.
Hexapawn
3×3 variant solved as a win for black, several other larger variants also solved.
Kalah
Most variants solved by Geoffrey Irving, Jeroen Donkers and Jos Uiterwijk (2000) except Kalah (6/6). The (6/6) variant was solved by Anders Carstensen (2011). Strong first-player advantage was proven in most cases.
L game
Easily solvable. Either player can force the game into a draw.
Maharajah and the Sepoys
This asymmetrical game is a win for the sepoys player with correct play.
Nim
Strongly solved.
Nine men's morris
Solved by Ralph Gasser (1993). Either player can force the game into a draw.
Order and Chaos
Order (First player) wins.
Ohvalhu
Weakly solved by humans, but proven by computers. (Dakon is, however, not identical to Ohvalhu, the game which actually had been observed by de Voogt)
Pangki
Strongly solved by Jason Doucette (2001). The game is a draw. There are only two unique first moves if you discard mirrored positions. One forces the draw, and the other gives the opponent a forced win in 15 moves.
Pentago
Strongly solved by Geoffrey Irving with use of a supercomputer at NERSC. The first player wins.
Quarto
Solved by Luc Goossens (1998). Two perfect players will always draw.
Renju-like game without opening rules involved
Claimed to be solved by János Wagner and István Virág (2001). A first-player win.
Teeko
Solved by Guy Steele (1998). Depending on the variant either a first-player win or a draw.
Three men's morris
Trivially solvable. Either player can force the game into a draw.
Three musketeers
Strongly solved by Johannes Laire in 2009, and weakly solved by Ali Elabridi in 2017. It is a win for the blue pieces (Cardinal Richelieu's men, or, the enemy).
Tic-tac-toe
Extremely trivially strongly solvable because of the small game tree. The game is a draw if no mistakes are made, with no mistake possible on the opening move.
Wythoff's game
Strongly solved by W. A. Wythoff in 1907.

== Weak-solves ==
English draughts (checkers)
This 8×8 variant of draughts was weakly solved on April 29, 2007, by the team of Jonathan Schaeffer. From the standard starting position, both players can guarantee a draw with perfect play. Checkers has a search space of 5×10^{20} possible game positions. The number of calculations involved was 10^{14}, which were done over a period of 18 years. The process involved from 200 desktop computers at its peak down to around 50.

Fanorona
Weakly solved by Maarten Schadd. The game is a draw.

Losing chess
Weakly solved in 2016 as a win for White beginning with 1. e3.

Othello (Reversi)
Weakly solved in 2023 by Hiroki Takizawa, a researcher at Preferred Networks. However, the paper's conclusions are contested. From the standard starting position on an 8×8 board, a perfect play by both players will result in a draw. Othello is the largest game solved to date, with a search space of 10^{28} possible game positions.

Pentominoes
Weakly solved by H. K. Orman. It is a win for the first player.

Qubic
Weakly solved by Oren Patashnik (1980) and Victor Allis. The first player wins.

Sim
Weakly solved: win for the second player.

Lambs and tigers
Weakly solved by Yew Jin Lim (2007). The game is a draw.

== Partially solved games ==
Chess
Fully solving chess remains elusive, and it is speculated that the complexity of the game may preclude it ever being solved. Through retrograde computer analysis and endgame tablebases, strong solutions have been found for all three- to seven-piece endgames, counting the two kings as pieces.
Some variants of chess on a smaller board with reduced numbers of pieces have been solved. Some other popular variants have also been solved; for example, a weak solution to Maharajah and the Sepoys is an easily memorable series of moves that guarantees victory to the "sepoys" player.
Go
The 5×5 board was weakly solved for all opening moves in 2002. The 7×7 board was weakly solved in 2015. Humans usually play on a 19×19 board, which is over 145 orders of magnitude more complex than 7×7.
Hex
A strategy-stealing argument (as used by John Nash) shows that all square board sizes cannot be lost by the first player. Combined with a proof of the impossibility of a draw, this shows that the game is a first player win (so it is ultra-weak solved). On particular board sizes, more is known: it is strongly solved by several computers for board sizes up to 6×6. Weak solutions are known for board sizes 7×7 (using a swapping strategy), 8×8, and 9×9; in the 8×8 case, a weak solution is known for all opening moves. Strongly solving Hex on an N×N board is unlikely as the problem has been shown to be PSPACE-complete. If Hex is played on an N×(N + 1) board then the player who has the shorter distance to connect can always win by a simple pairing strategy, even with the disadvantage of playing second.

International draughts
All endgame positions with two through seven pieces were solved, as well as positions with 4×4 and 5×3 pieces where each side had one king or fewer, positions with five men versus four men, positions with five men versus three men and one king, and positions with four men and one king versus four men. The endgame positions were solved in 2007 by Ed Gilbert of the United States. Computer analysis showed that it was highly likely to end in a draw if both players played perfectly.
Morabaraba
Strongly solved by Gábor E. Gévay (2015). The first player wins in optimal play.
m,n,k-game
It is trivial to show that the second player can never win; see strategy-stealing argument. Almost all cases have been solved weakly for k ≤ 4. Some results are known for k = 5. The games are drawn for k ≥ 8.

== See also ==
- Computer chess
- Computer Go
- Computer Othello
- Game complexity
- God's algorithm
- Zermelo's theorem (game theory)
