= List of things named after Stefan Banach =

Stefan Banach was a Polish mathematician who made key contributions to mathematics. This article contains some of the things named in his memory.

== Mathematics ==
- Banach algebra
  - Amenable Banach algebra
- Banach Jordan algebra
  - Banach function algebra
  - Banach *-algebra
  - Banach algebra cohomology
- Banach bundle
  - Banach bundle (non-commutative geometry)
- Banach fixed-point theorem
- Banach game
- Banach lattice
- Banach limit
- Banach manifold
- Banach measure
- Banach space
  - Banach coordinate space
  - Banach disks
  - Banach norm
- Banach–Alaoglu theorem
- Banach–Mazur compactum
- Banach–Mazur game
- Banach–Mazur theorem
- Banach–Ruziewicz problem
- Banach-Saks theorem
- Banach-Schauder theorem
- Banach–Steinhaus theorem
- Banach–Stone theorem
- Banach–Tarski paradox
- Banach's matchbox problem
- Hahn–Banach theorem
  - Hahn–Banach theorem for seminorms
  - Vector-valued Hahn–Banach theorems

== Other ==
- 16856 Banach
- Banach Journal of Mathematical Analysis
- Stefan Banach Prize
- International Stefan Banach Prize
