= Cohomology of algebras =

In mathematics, the homology or cohomology of an algebra may refer to

- Banach algebra cohomology of a bimodule over a Banach algebra
- Cyclic homology of an associative algebra
- Group cohomology of a module over a group ring or a representation of a group
- Hochschild homology of a bimodule over an associative algebra
- Lie algebra cohomology of a module over a Lie algebra
- Supplemented algebra cohomology of a module over a supplemented associative algebra

== See also ==
- Cohomology
- Ext functor
- Tor functor
