= Positional game =

Type of two player combinatorial game

A positional game in game theory is a kind of a combinatorial game for two players. It is described by:

- $X$ – a finite set of elements. Often $X$ is called the board and its elements are called positions.
- $\mathcal{F}$ – a family of subsets of $X$. These subsets are usually called the winning sets.
- A criterion for winning the game.

During the game, players alternately claim previously-unclaimed positions, until one of the players wins. If all positions in $X$ are taken while no player wins, the game is considered a draw.

The classic example of a positional game is tic-tac-toe. In it, $X$ contains the 9 squares of the game-board, $\mathcal{F}$ contains the 8 lines that determine a victory (3 horizontal, 3 vertical and 2 diagonal), and the winning criterion is: the first player who holds an entire winning-set wins. Other examples of positional games are Hex and the Shannon switching game.

For every positional game there are exactly three options: either the first player has a winning strategy, or the second player has a winning strategy, or both players have strategies to enforce a draw. The main question of interest in the study of these games is which of these three options holds in any particular game.

A positional game is finite, deterministic and has perfect information; therefore, in theory it is possible to create the full game tree and determine which of these three options holds. In practice, however, the game-tree might be enormous. Therefore, positional games are usually analyzed via more sophisticated combinatorial techniques.

== Alternative terminology ==
Often, the input to a positional game is considered a hypergraph. In this case:

- The elements of $X$ are called vertices (or points), and denoted by V;
- The elements of $\mathcal{F}$ are called edges (or hyperedges), and denoted by E or H.

== Variants ==
There are many variants of positional games, differing in their rules and their winning criteria.

=== Different winning criteria ===
Strong positional game (also called Maker-Maker game)
The first player to claim all of the elements of a winning set wins. If the game ends with all elements of the board claimed, but no player has claimed all elements of a winning set, it is a draw. An example is classic tic-tac-toe.
Maker-Breaker game
The two players are called Maker and Breaker. Maker wins by claiming all elements of a winning set. If the game ends with all elements of the board claimed, and Maker has not yet won, then Breaker wins. Draws are not possible. An example is the Shannon switching game.
Avoider-Enforcer game
The players are called Avoider and Enforcer. Enforcer wins if Avoider ever claims all of the elements of a winning set. If the game ends with all elements of the board claimed, and Avoider has not claimed a winning set, then Avoider wins. As in maker-breaker games, a draw is not possible. An example is Sim.
Discrepancy game
The players are called Balancer and Unbalancer. Balancer wins if he ensures that in all winning sets, each player has roughly half of the vertices. Otherwise Unbalancer wins.
Scoring game
Comparing at the end the winning sets obtained by the players, whoever has the winning set with the highest score wins, where the score of each winning set is given in the instance. An example is the Largest Connected Subgraph Game, where the positions are the vertices of a graph, the winning sets are connected subgraphs and the winner is the one who obtains the largest connected subgraph.

=== Different game rules ===
Waiter-Client game (also called Picker-Chooser game)
The players are called Waiter and Client. In each turn, Waiter picks two positions and shows them to Client, who can choose one of them.
Biased positional game
Each positional game has a biased variant, in which the first player can take p elements at a time and the second player can take q elements at a time (in the unbiased variant, p=q=1).

== Specific games ==
The following table lists some specific positional games that were widely studied in the literature.

Name	Positions	Winning sets
Multi-dimensional tic-tac-toe	All squares in a multi-dimensional box	All straight lines
Shannon switching game	All edges of a graph	All paths from s to t
Sim	All edges between 6 vertices.	All triangles [losing sets].
Clique game (aka Ramsey game)	All edges of a complete graph of size n	All cliques of size k
Connectivity game	All edges of a complete graph	All spanning trees
Hamiltonicity game	All edges of a complete graph	All Hamiltonian paths
Non-planarity game	All edges of a complete graph	All non-planar sub-graphs
Arithmetic progression game	The numbers {1,...,n}	All arithmetic progressions of size k

== See also ==
- Topological game, a generalization of a positional game to infinite sets
- Banach–Mazur game, a game played on a topological space by choosing among certain subsets, with winning conditions resembling those of a maker-breaker game
