= Arithmetic progression game =

Positional game

In combinatorial game theory, an arithmetic progression game is a positional game where two players alternately pick numbers, trying to occupy a complete arithmetic progression of a given size.

The game is parameterized by two integers $n>k$. The game-board is the set $\{1,\dots,n\}$. The winning-sets are all the arithmetic progressions of length $k$. In a Maker-Breaker game variant, the first player (Maker) wins by occupying a $k$-length arithmetic progression, otherwise the second player (Breaker) wins.

The game is also called the van der Waerden game, named after Van der Waerden's theorem. It says that, for any $k$, there exists some integer $W(2,k)$ such that, if the integers $\{1, \dots,W(2,k)$ are partitioned arbitrarily into two sets, then at least one set contains an arithmetic progression of length $k$. This means that, if $n \geq W(2,k)$, then Maker has a winning strategy.

This claim is not constructive - it does not show a specific strategy for Maker. Moreover, the current upper bound for $W(2,k)$ is extremely large: the currently known bounds are
$$2^{k}/k^\varepsilon < W(2,k) < 2^{2^{2^{2^{2^{k+9}}}}}$$
for every $\varepsilon>0$.

Let $W^*(2,k)$ be the smallest integer such that Maker has a winning strategy. Beck proves that $2^{k-7k^{7/8}} < W^*(2,k) < k^3 2^{k-4}$. In particular, if $k^3 2^{k-4} < n$, then the game is Maker's win (even though it is much smaller than the number that guarantees no-draw).
