= Postage stamp problem =

Mathematical riddle

13 is the smallest total that cannot fit on an envelope with space for only three stamps of possible values 1, 2, 5 and 20

The postage stamp problem is a mathematical riddle that asks what is the smallest postage value which cannot be placed on an envelope, if the latter can hold only a limited number of stamps, and these may only have certain specified face values.

For example, suppose the envelope can hold only three stamps, and the available stamp values are 1 cent, 2 cents, 5 cents, and 20 cents. Then the solution is 13 cents; since any smaller value can be obtained with at most three stamps (e.g. 4 = 2 + 2, 8 = 5 + 2 + 1, etc.), but to get 13 cents one must use at least four stamps.

== Mathematical definition ==
Mathematically, the problem can be formulated as follows:

Given an integer m and a set V of positive integers, find the smallest integer z that cannot be written as the sum v_{1} + v_{2} + ··· + v_{k} of some number k ≤ m of (not necessarily distinct) elements of V.

== Complexity ==
This problem can be solved by brute force search or backtracking with maximum time proportional to |V |^{m}, where |V | is the number of distinct stamp values allowed. Therefore, if the capacity of the envelope m is fixed, it is a polynomial time problem. If the capacity m is arbitrary, the problem is known to be NP-hard.

== See also ==
- Coin problem
- Knapsack problem
- Subset sum problem
