= Banach bundle (non-commutative geometry) =

In mathematics, a Banach bundle is a fiber bundle over a topological Hausdorff space, such that each fiber has the structure of a Banach space.

== Definition ==
Let $X$ be a topological Hausdorff space, a (continuous) Banach bundle over $X$ is a tuple $\mathfrak{B} = (B, \pi)$, where $B$ is a topological Hausdorff space, and $\pi\colon B\to X$ is a continuous, open surjection, such that each fiber $B_x := \pi^{-1}(x)$ is a Banach space. Which satisfies the following conditions:

1. The map $b\mapsto\|b\|$ is continuous for all $b\in B$
2. The operation $+\colon\{(b_1,b_2)\in B\times B:\pi(b_1)=\pi(b_2)\}\to B$ is continuous
3. For every $\lambda\in\mathbb{C}$, the map $b\mapsto\lambda\cdot b$ is continuous
4. If $x\in X$, and $\{b_i\}$ is a net in $B$, such that $\|b_i\|\to 0$ and $\pi(b_i)\to x$, then $b_i\to 0_x\in B$, where $0_x$ denotes the zero of the fiber $B_x$.

If the map $b\mapsto \|b\|$ is only upper semi-continuous, $\mathfrak{B}$ is called upper semi-continuous bundle.

== Examples ==
=== Trivial bundle ===
Let A be a Banach space, X be a topological Hausdorff space. Define $B := A\times X$ and $\pi\colon B\to X$ by $\pi(a,x) := x$. Then $(B,\pi)$ is a Banach bundle, called the trivial bundle

== See also ==
- Banach bundles in differential geometry
