= Banach's matchbox problem =

Problem in probability

Banach's match problem is a classic problem in probability attributed to Stefan Banach. Feller says that the problem was inspired by a humorous reference to Banach's smoking habit in a speech honouring him by Hugo Steinhaus, but that it was not Banach who set the problem or provided an answer.

Suppose a mathematician carries two matchboxes at all times: one in his left pocket and one in his right. Each time he needs a match, he is equally likely to take it from either pocket. Suppose he reaches into his pocket and discovers for the first time that the box picked is empty. If it is assumed that each of the matchboxes originally contained $N$ matches, what is the probability that there are exactly $k$ matches in the other box?

== Solution ==
Without loss of generality consider the case where the matchbox in his right pocket has an unlimited number of matches and let $M$ be the number of matches removed from this one before the left one is found to be empty. When the left pocket is found to be empty, the man has chosen that pocket $(N+1)$ times. Then $M$ is the number of successes before $(N+1)$ failures in Bernoulli trials with $p=1/2$, which has the negative binomial distribution and thus

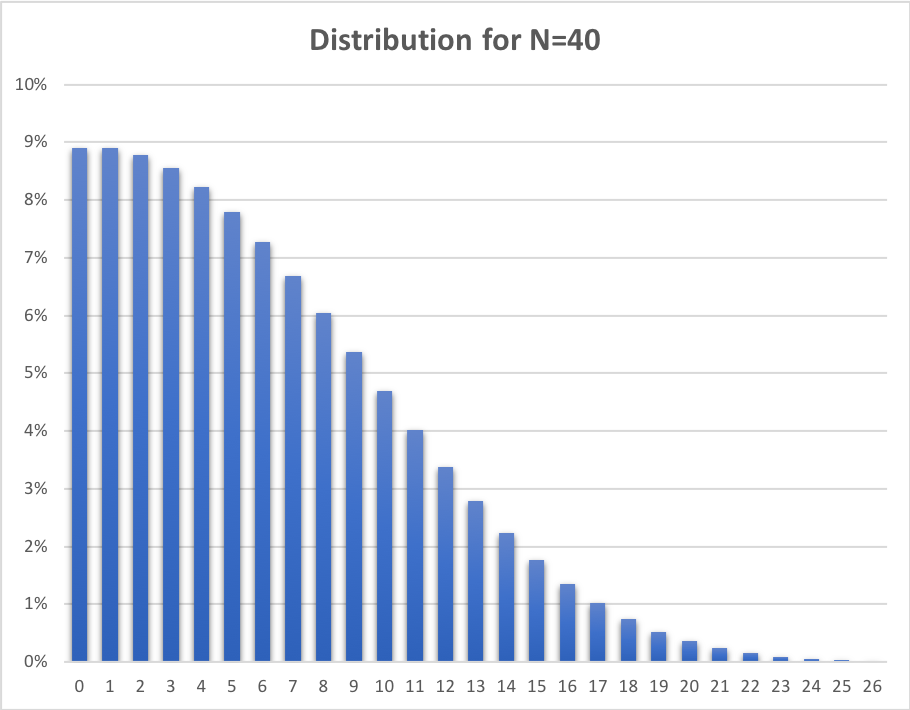
Distribution of probability of having k matches remaining in the other pocket.

$$P[M=m] = \binom{N+m}{m}\left(\frac{1}{2}\right)^{N+1+m}$$.

Returning to the original problem, we see that the probability that the left pocket is found to be empty first is $P[M<N+1]$ which equals $1/2$ because both are equally likely. We see that the number $K$ of matches remaining in the other pocket is

$$P[K=k] = P[M=N-k|M<N+1] = 2P[M=N-k] = \binom{2N-k}{N - k}\left(\frac{1}{2}\right)^{2N-k}$$.

The expectation of the distribution is $4^{1-N} r \binom{2 N - 1}{N} = \frac{2\left(N-\frac{1}{2}\right)!}{\sqrt{\pi}\left(N-1\right)!}$. This may be approximated as $2\sqrt{N/\pi}-1$. (This is shown using Stirling's approximation.)

As an example, starting with boxes with $N=40$ matches, the expected number of matches in the second box is approximately $7$.

== See also ==
- List of things named after Stefan Banach
