= Banach game =

Topological game in math

In mathematics, the Banach game is a topological game introduced by Stefan Banach in 1935 in the second addendum to problem 43 of the Scottish book as a variation of the Banach–Mazur game.

Given a subset $X$ of real numbers, two players alternately write down arbitrary (not necessarily in $X$) positive real numbers $x_0, x_1, x_2,\ldots$ such that $x_0 > x_1 > x_2 >\cdots$ Player one wins if and only if $\sum^\infty_{i=0} x_i$ exists and is in $X$.

One observation about the game is that if $X$ is a countable set, then either of the players can cause the final sum to avoid the set. Thus in this situation the second player has a winning strategy.
