= Choquet game =

Topological game

The Choquet game is a topological game named after Gustave Choquet, who was in 1969 the first to investigate such games. A closely related game is known as the strong Choquet game.

Let $X$ be a non-empty topological space. The Choquet game of $X$, $G(X)$, is defined as follows: Player I chooses $U_0$, a non-empty open subset of $X$, then Player II chooses $V_0$, a non-empty open subset of $U_0$, then Player I chooses $U_1$, a non-empty open subset of $V_0$, etc. The players continue this process, constructing a sequence $U_0 \supseteq V_0 \supseteq U_1 \supseteq V_1 \supseteq U_2 ...$.

If $\bigcap\limits_{i=0}^{\infty} U_i = \emptyset$ then Player I wins, otherwise Player II wins.

It was proven by John C. Oxtoby that a non-empty topological space $X$ is a Baire space if and only if Player I has no winning strategy. A nonempty topological space $X$ in which Player II has a winning strategy is called a Choquet space. (Note that it is possible that neither player has a winning strategy.) Thus every Choquet space is Baire. On the other hand, there are Baire spaces (even separable metrizable ones) that are not Choquet spaces, so the converse fails.

The strong Choquet game of $X$, $G^s(X)$, is defined similarly, except that Player I chooses $(x_0,U_0)$, then Player II chooses $V_0$, then Player I chooses $(x_1,U_1)$, etc, such that $x_i \in U_i, V_i$ for all $i$. A topological space $X$ in which Player II has a winning strategy for $G^s(X)$ is called a strong Choquet space. Every strong Choquet space is a Choquet space, although the converse does not hold.

All nonempty complete metric spaces and compact T_{2} spaces are strong Choquet. (In the first case, Player II, given $(x_i,U_i)$, chooses $V_i$ such that $\operatorname{diam}(V_i)<1/i$ and $\operatorname{cl}(V_i) \subseteq V_{i-1}$. Then the sequence $\left \{ x_i \right \} \to x \in V_i$ for all $i$.) Any subset of a strong Choquet space that is a $G_\delta$ set is strong Choquet. Metrizable spaces are completely metrizable if and only if they are strong Choquet.
