= Strong positional game =

Type of sequential game

A strong positional game (also called Maker-Maker game) is a kind of positional game. Like most positional games, it is described by its set of positions ($X$) and its family of winning-sets ($\mathcal{F}$- a family of subsets of $X$). It is played by two players, called First and Second, who alternately take previously untaken positions.

In a strong positional game, the winner is the first player who holds all the elements of a winning-set. If all positions are taken and no player wins, then it is a draw. Classic Tic-tac-toe is an example of a strong positional game.

== First player advantage ==
In a strong positional game, Second cannot have a winning strategy. This can be proved by a strategy-stealing argument: if Second had a winning strategy, then First could have stolen it and win too, but this is impossible since there is only one winner. Therefore, for every strong-positional game there are only two options: either First has a winning strategy, or Second has a drawing strategy.

An interesting corollary is that, if a certain game does not have draw positions, then First always has a winning strategy.

== Comparison to Maker-Breaker game ==
Every strong positional game has a variant that is a Maker-Breaker game. In that variant, only the first player ("Maker") can win by holding a winning-set. The second player ("Breaker") can win only by preventing Maker from holding a winning-set.

For fixed $X$ and $\mathcal{F}$, the strong-positional variant is strictly harder for the first player, since in it, he needs to both "attack" (try to get a winning-set) and "defend" (prevent the second player from getting one), while in the maker-breaker variant, the first player can focus only on "attack". Hence, every winning-strategy of First in a strong-positional game is also a winning-strategy of Maker in the corresponding maker-breaker game. The opposite is not true. For example, in the maker-breaker variant of Tic-Tac-Toe, Maker has a winning strategy, but in its strong-positional (classic) variant, Second has a drawing strategy.

Similarly, the strong-positional variant is strictly easier for the second player: every winning strategy of Breaker in a maker-breaker game is also a drawing-strategy of Second in the corresponding strong-positional game, but the opposite is not true.

=== The extra-set paradox ===
Suppose First has a winning strategy. Now, we add a new set to $\mathcal{F}$. Contrary to intuition, it is possible that this new set will now destroy the winning strategy and make the game a draw. Intuitively, the reason is that First might have to spend some moves to prevent Second from owning this extra set.

The extra-set paradox does not appear in Maker-Breaker games.

== Examples ==
=== The clique game ===
The clique game is an example of a strong positional game. It is parametrized by two integers, n and N. In it:

- $X$ contains all edges of the complete graph on {1,...,N};
- $\mathcal{F}$ contains all cliques of size n.

According to Ramsey's theorem, there exists some number R(n,n) such that, for every N > R(n,n), in every two-coloring of the complete graph on {1,...,N}, one of the colors must contain a clique of size n.

Therefore, by the above corollary, when N > R(n,n), First always has a winning strategy.

=== Multi-dimensional tic-tac-toe ===
Consider the game of tic-tac-toe played in a d-dimensional cube of length n. By the Hales–Jewett theorem, when d is large enough (as a function of n), every 2-coloring of the cube-cells contains a monochromatic geometric line.

Therefore, by the above corollary, First always has a winning strategy.

== Open questions ==
Besides these existential results, there are few constructive results related to strong-positional games. For example, while it is known that the first player has a winning strategy in a sufficiently large clique game, no specific winning strategy is currently known.
