= Avoider-Enforcer game =

Game where players avoid making losing-sets

An Avoider-Enforcer game (also called Avoider-Forcer game or Antimaker-Antibreaker game) is a kind of positional game. Like most positional games, it is described by a set of positions/points/elements ($X$) and a family of subsets ($\mathcal{F}$), which are called here the losing-sets. It is played by two players, called Avoider and Enforcer, who take turns picking elements until all elements are taken. Avoider wins if he manages to avoid taking a losing set; Enforcer wins if he manages to make Avoider take a losing set.

The board for the game of Sim, an Avoider-Enforcer game

A classic example of such a game is Sim. There, the positions are all the edges of the complete graph on 6 vertices. Players take turns to shade a line in their color, and lose when they form a full triangle of their own color: the losing sets are all the triangles.

== Comparison to Maker-Breaker games ==
The winning condition of an Avoider-Enforcer game is exactly the opposite of the winning condition of the Maker-Breaker game on the same $\mathcal{F}$. Thus, the Avoider-Enforcer game is the Misère game variant of the Maker-Breaker game. However, there are counter-intuitive differences between these game-types.

For example, consider the biased version of the games, in which the first player takes p elements each turn and the second player takes q elements each turn (in the standard version p=1 and q=1). Maker-Breaker games are bias-monotonic: taking more elements is always an advantage. Formally, if Maker wins the (p:q) Maker-Breaker game, then he also wins the (p+1:q) game and the (p:q-1) game. Avoider-Enforcer games are not bias-monotonic: taking more elements is not always a disadvantage. For example, consider a very simple Avoider-Enforcer game where the losing sets are {w,x} and {y,z}. Then, Avoider wins the (1:1) game, Enforcer wins the (1:2) game and Avoider wins the (2:2) game.

There is a monotone variant of the (p:q) Avoider-Enforcer game-rules, in which Avoider has to pick at least p elements each turn and Enforcer has to pick at least q elements each turn; this variant is bias-monotonic.

== Partial avoidance ==
Similarly to Maker-Breaker games, Avoider-Enforcer games also have fractional generalizations.

Suppose Avoider needs to avoid taking at least a fraction t of the elements in any winning-set (i.e., take at most 1-t of the elements in any set), and Enforcer needs to prevent this, i.e., Enforcer needs to take less than a fraction t of the elements in some winning-set. Define the constant: $c_t := (2t)^t \cdot (2-2t)^{1-t} = 2 \cdot t^t \cdot (1-t)^{1-t}$(in the standard variant, $t=1, c_t\to 2$).

- If $\sum_{E\in \mathcal{F}} {c_t}^{-|E|} < 1$, and the total number of elements is even, then Avoider has a winning strategy when playing first.

== See also ==
Biased positional game#A winning condition for Avoider
