= Misère =

Card game bid to win as few tricks as possible

Misère (French for "destitution"), misere, nullo, bettel, betl, beddl or bettler (German for "beggar"; equivalent terms in other languages include Spanish: contrabola, pobre, and Italian: devole) is a bid in various card games, and the player who bids misère undertakes to win no tricks or as few as possible, usually at no trump, in the round to be played. This does not allow sufficient variety to constitute a game in its own right, but it is the basis of such trick-avoidance games as Hearts, and provides an optional contract for most games involving an auction. The term or category may also be used for some card game of its own with the same aim, like Black Peter.

A misère bid usually indicates an extremely poor hand, hence the name. An open or lay down misère, or misère ouvert is a 500 bid where the player is so sure of losing every trick that they undertake to do so with their cards placed face-up on the table. Consequently, 'lay down misère' is Australian gambling slang for a predicted easy victory.

In Skat, the bidding can result in a null game, where the bidder wins only if they lose every trick. (Conversely, the opponents win by forcing the bidder to take a trick.) In Swedish Whist, by contrast, a null game is one in which both teams try to take the fewest tricks. This variation is known as ramsch in Skat.

In Spades, bidding for no tricks is known as bidding nil, which if successful gives the bidder a bonus.

The word is first recorded in this sense in the rules for the game "Boston" in the late 18th century. It cannot be played in 6 hand 500.

== Misère game ==
A misère game or bettel game is a game that is played according to its conventional rules, except that it is "played to lose"; that is, the winner is the one who loses according to the normal game rules. Or, if the game is for more than two players, the one who wins according to the normal game rules loses. Such games generally have rulesets that normally encourage players to win; for example, most variations of checkers (draughts) require players to make a capture move if it is available; thus, in the misère variation, players can force their opponents to take numerous checkers through intentionally "poor" play (see poddavki).

In combinatorial game theory, a misère game is one played according to the "misère play condition"; that is, a player unable to move wins. (This is in contrast to the "normal play condition" in which a player unable to move loses.) Examples of games that use the misère play condition include Sylver coinage.

== See also ==
- Vole - the opposite of a misère
- Avoider-Enforcer game
- Losing chess
