= Banach–Mazur game =

Type of topological game with two players

In general topology, set theory and game theory, a Banach–Mazur game is a topological game played by two players, trying to pin down elements in a set (space). The concept of a Banach–Mazur game is closely related to the concept of Baire spaces. This game was the first infinite positional game of perfect information to be studied. It was introduced by Stanisław Mazur as problem 43 in the Scottish book, and Mazur's questions about it were answered by Banach.

== Definition ==
Let $Y$ be a non-empty topological space, $X$ a fixed subset of $Y$ and $\mathcal{W}$ a family of subsets of $Y$ that have the following properties:

- Each member of $\mathcal{W}$ has non-empty interior.
- Each non-empty open subset of $Y$ contains a member of $\mathcal{W}$.

Players, $P_1$ and $P_2$ alternately choose elements from $\mathcal{W}$ to form a sequence $W_0 \supseteq W_1 \supseteq \cdots.$

$P_1$ wins if and only if

$$X \cap \left  (\bigcap_{n<\omega} W_n \right ) \neq \emptyset.$$
Otherwise, $P_2$ wins. This is called a general Banach–Mazur game and denoted by $MB(X,Y, \mathcal{W}).$

== Properties ==
- $P_2$ has a winning strategy if and only if $X$ is of the first category in $Y$ (a set is of the first category or meagre if it is the countable union of nowhere-dense sets).
- If $Y$ is a complete metric space, $P_1$ has a winning strategy if and only if $X$ is comeager in some non-empty open subset of $Y.$
- If $X$ has the Baire property in $Y$, then $MB(X,Y,\mathcal{W})$ is determined.
- The siftable and strongly-siftable spaces introduced by Choquet can be defined in terms of stationary strategies in suitable modifications of the game. Let $BM(X)$ denote a modification of $MB(X,Y,\mathcal{W})$ where $X=Y, \mathcal{W}$ is the family of all non-empty open sets in $X$ and $P_2$ wins a play $(W_0, W_1, \cdots)$ if and only if
  $$\bigcap_{n<\omega} W_n \neq \emptyset.$$
  Then $X$ is siftable if and only if $P_2$ has a stationary winning strategy in $BM(X).$
- A Markov winning strategy for $P_2$ in $BM(X)$ can be reduced to a stationary winning strategy. Furthermore, if $P_2$ has a winning strategy in $BM(X)$, then $P_2$ has a winning strategy depending only on two preceding moves. It is still an unsettled question whether a winning strategy for $P_2$ can be reduced to a winning strategy that depends only on the last two moves of $P_1$.
- $X$ is called weakly $\alpha$-favorable if $P_2$ has a winning strategy in $BM(X)$. Then, $X$ is a Baire space if and only if $P_1$ has no winning strategy in $BM(X)$. It follows that each weakly $\alpha$-favorable space is a Baire space.

Many other modifications and specializations of the basic game have been proposed: for a thorough account of these, refer to [1987].

The most common special case arises when $Y = J = [0, 1]$ and $\mathcal{W}$ consist of all closed intervals in the unit interval. Then $P_1$ wins if and only if $X \cap (\cap_{n<\omega} J_n) \neq \emptyset$ and $P_2$ wins if and only if $X\cap (\cap_{n<\omega} J_n) = \emptyset$. This game is denoted by $MB(X, J).$

== A simple proof: winning strategies ==
It is natural to ask for what sets $X$ does $P_2$ have a winning strategy in $MB(X,Y,\mathcal W)$. Clearly, if $X$ is empty, $P_2$ has a winning strategy, therefore the question can be informally rephrased as how "small" (respectively, "big") does $X$ (respectively, the complement of $X$ in $Y$) have to be to ensure that $P_2$ has a winning strategy. The following result gives a flavor of how the proofs used to derive the properties in the previous section work:

Proposition. $P_2$ has a winning strategy in $MB(X,Y,\mathcal W)$ if $X$ is countable, $Y$ is T_{1}, and $Y$ has no isolated points.

Proof. Index the elements of X as a sequence: $x_1, x_2, \cdots.$ Suppose $P_1$ has chosen $W_1,$ if $U_1$ is the non-empty interior of $W_1$ then $U_1 \setminus \{x_1\}$ is a non-empty open set in $Y,$ so $P_2$ can choose $\mathcal{W} \ni W_2 \subset U_1 \setminus \{x_1\}.$ Then $P_1$ chooses $W_3 \subset W_2$ and, in a similar fashion, $P_2$ can choose $W_4 \subset W_3$ that excludes $x_2$. Continuing in this way, each point $x_n$ will be excluded by the set $W_{2n},$ so that the intersection of all $W_n$ will not intersect $X$.

The assumptions on $Y$ are key to the proof: for instance, if $Y=\{a,b,c\}$ is equipped with the discrete topology and $\mathcal{W}$ consists of all non-empty subsets of $Y$, then $P_2$ has no winning strategy if $X=\{a\}$ (as a matter of fact, her opponent has a winning strategy). Similar effects happen if $Y$ is equipped with indiscrete topology and $\mathcal{W}=\{Y\}.$

A stronger result relates $X$ to first-order sets.

Proposition. $P_2$ has a winning strategy in $MB(X,Y,\mathcal W)$ if and only if $X$ is meagre.

This does not imply that $P_1$ has a winning strategy if $X$ is not meagre. In fact, if $Y$ is a complete metric space, then $P_1$ has a winning strategy if and only if there is some $W_i \in \mathcal{W}$ such that $X \cap W_i$ is a comeagre subset of $W_i.$ It may be the case that neither player has a winning strategy: let $Y$ be the unit interval and $\mathcal{W}$ be the family of closed intervals in the unit interval. The game is determined if the target set has the property of Baire, i.e. if it differs from an open set by a meagre set (but the converse is not true). Assuming the axiom of choice, there are subsets of the unit interval for which the Banach–Mazur game is not determined.

== See also ==
- Choquet game
