= Banach algebra cohomology =

In mathematics, Banach algebra cohomology of a Banach algebra with coefficients in a bimodule is a cohomology theory defined in a similar way to Hochschild cohomology of an abstract algebra, except that one takes the topology into account so that all cochains and so on are continuous.
