= RIF rating list =

Global ranking of Renju players

RIF rating list is an official ranking system maintained by the Renju International Federation (RIF), to indicate the rankings of Renju players all over the world. The rating system was established in General Assembly 1995 of RIF. Games between Renju players in formal tournaments are counted in the calculation of the ranking list, including World Championships, European Championships, National Championships and some other important tournaments. The RIF rating list is usually updated daily. The ratings are maintained by the Qualification Commission of RIF. According to the qualification system of the World Renju Championship, all the players with at least 10 games with established players, and within the top-20 of the RIF rating list, have the tickets to take part in the qualification tournament of the World Renju Championship. The RIF rating list had been based on the Elo rating system before 2021, and was migrated to the whole-history rating system in August 2021.

== Top players ==
The top 20 players of the RIF rating list (updated on August 6, 2026) are listed as follows:

Rank	Player	Rating
1	(Russia) Vladimir Sushkov	2900
3	(Chinese Taipei) Lin Shu-Hsuan	2849
3	(Japan) Tomoharu Nakayama	2847
4	(Japan) Shunsuke Kamiya	2844
5	(China) Ling Shijie	2842
6	(Estonia) Ants Soosõrv	2817
7	(Macau) Wai Chan Keong	2789
8	(China) Jiang Qiwen	2788
9	(China) Qi Guan	2782
10	(Japan) Hiroshi Okabe	2765
11	(China) Zhu Jianfeng	2762
12	(China) Ai Xianping	2759
13	(China) Huang Liqin	2758
14	(China) Ni Zhongxing	2757
15	(China) Wu Di	2757
16	(China) Mei Fan	2749
17	(China) Huang Shengming	2744
18	(Russia) Danila Gromov	2724
19	(Russia) Maxim Orlov	2722
20	(China) Zhao Yun	2720

== Historical top players by year ==
The list of historical top 5 players by year (retrieved on December 31 every year) is listed as follows:

Year	1st	2nd	3rd	4th	5th
1998	(Japan) Shigeru Nakamura	(Japan) Kazuto Hasegawa	(Japan) Norihiko Kawamura	(Estonia) Ando Meritee	(Japan) Takashi Sagara
1999	(Japan) Shigeru Nakamura	(Estonia) Ando Meritee	(Japan) Norihiko Kawamura	(Japan) Kazuto Hasegawa	(Russia) Dmitry Ilyin
2000	(Japan) Shigeru Nakamura	(Estonia) Ando Meritee	(Japan) Norihiko Kawamura	(Japan) Hideki Nara	(Russia) Igor Sinyov
2001	(Estonia) Ando Meritee	(Japan) Shigeru Nakamura	(Japan) Norihiko Kawamura	(Russia) Vladimir Sushkov	(Russia) Igor Sinyov
2002	(Estonia) Ando Meritee	(Japan) Shigeru Nakamura	(Japan) Norihiko Kawamura	(Russia) Vladimir Sushkov	(Japan) Makoto Yamaguchi
2003	(Japan) Shigeru Nakamura	(Estonia) Ando Meritee	(Japan) Norihiko Kawamura	(Russia) Vladimir Sushkov	(Russia) Konstantin Chingin
2004	(Japan) Shigeru Nakamura	(Japan) Norihiko Kawamura	(Estonia) Ando Meritee	(Russia) Alexandr Klimashin	(Russia) Konstantin Chingin
2005	(Japan) Shigeru Nakamura	(Japan) Norihiko Kawamura	(Estonia) Ando Meritee	(Japan) Kazuto Hasegawa	(Russia) Konstantin Chingin
2006	(Japan) Shigeru Nakamura	(Japan) Kazuto Hasegawa	(Japan) Norihiko Kawamura	(Estonia) Ando Meritee	(Japan) Yusui Yamaguchi
2007	(Japan) Shigeru Nakamura	(Japan) Kazuto Hasegawa	(Estonia) Ando Meritee	(Japan) Norihiko Kawamura	(Japan) Yusui Yamaguchi
2008	(Japan) Shigeru Nakamura	(Japan) Kazuto Hasegawa	(Estonia) Ando Meritee	(Japan) Norihiko Kawamura	(Japan) Hiroshi Okabe
2009	(Japan) Shigeru Nakamura	(Japan) Kazuto Hasegawa	(Estonia) Ando Meritee	(Japan) Norihiko Kawamura	(Estonia) Tunnet Taimla
2010	(Japan) Shigeru Nakamura	(Estonia) Ando Meritee	(Estonia) Tunnet Taimla	(Japan) Yuuki Oosumi	(Japan) Kazuto Hasegawa
2011	(Japan) Shigeru Nakamura	(Estonia) Ando Meritee	(China) Cao Dong	(China) Yang Yanxi	(Japan) Yuuki Oosumi
2012	(Japan) Shigeru Nakamura	(Estonia) Ando Meritee	(China) Yang Yanxi	(Japan) Yuuki Oosumi	(China) Li Yi
2013	(Japan) Shigeru Nakamura	(Japan) Yuuki Oosumi	(China) Yang Yanxi	(Estonia) Tunnet Taimla	(China) Li Yi
2014	(Japan) Shigeru Nakamura	(Estonia) Ando Meritee	(China) Yang Yanxi	(Japan) Yuuki Oosumi	(Estonia) Tunnet Taimla
2015	(Estonia) Ando Meritee	(China) Yang Yanxi	(Japan) Shigeru Nakamura	(Japan) Yuuki Oosumi	(Russia) Konstantin Chingin
2016	(Japan) Shigeru Nakamura	(Estonia) Ando Meritee	(China) Yang Yanxi	(Russia) Konstantin Chingin	(Japan) Yuuki Oosumi
2017	(Estonia) Ando Meritee	(Japan) Shigeru Nakamura	(Japan) Tomoharu Nakayama	(China) Zhu Jianfeng	(Russia) Vladimir Sushkov
2018	(Japan) Shigeru Nakamura	(Estonia) Ando Meritee	(China) Yang Yanxi	(Russia) Konstantin Chingin	(Japan) Tomoharu Nakayama
2019	(Japan) Shigeru Nakamura	(China) Yang Yanxi	(Japan) Shunsuke Kamiya	(China) Li Yi	(Japan) Yuuki Oosumi
2020	(Japan) Shigeru Nakamura	(China) Yang Yanxi	(Japan) Tomoharu Nakayama	(China) Li Yi	(Japan) Shunsuke Kamiya
2021	(Japan) Shigeru Nakamura	(China) Yang Yanxi	(Russia) Vladimir Sushkov	(Chinese Taipei) Lin Shu-Hsuan	(Japan) Shunsuke Kamiya
2022	(Japan) Shigeru Nakamura	(Chinese Taipei) Lin Shu-Hsuan	(Russia) Vladimir Sushkov	(China) Yang Yanxi	(Japan) Tomoharu Nakayama
2023	(Japan) Shigeru Nakamura	(China) Yang Yanxi	(Russia) Vladimir Sushkov	(Japan) Shunsuke Kamiya	(Chinese Taipei) Lin Shu-Hsuan
2024	(Japan) Shigeru Nakamura	(Russia) Vladimir Sushkov	(Japan) Shunsuke Kamiya	(Chinese Taipei) Lin Shu-Hsuan	(Estonia) Ants Soosõrv
2025	(Japan) Shigeru Nakamura	(Russia) Vladimir Sushkov	(Japan) Shunsuke Kamiya	(Chinese Taipei) Lin Shu-Hsuan	(Japan) Tomoharu Nakayama

== See also ==
- Renju
- Renju International Federation
- World Championships in Renju
