= Meijin (renju) =

Meijin (名人) is a Renju title in Japan. The Meijin title tournament, formally called the All Japan Renju Meijin-sen (全日本連珠名人戦), is played every year in Japan since 1962. The Meijin-sen tournament is one of the most important Renju tournaments in Japan.

== History and Rule ==
The first Meijin-sen tournament is organized by the Japanese Renju Federation in 1962. Since then, the tournament is played every year except for 1974. During every year with the Meijin title match, two rounds of qualification tournaments are held in parallel in different regions of Japan. The A-class league is made up of 10 players, which are composed of winners of different qualification tournaments, together with three seeds from the last tournament. A round-robin tournament is held among the A-class league, and the winner of the A-class league becomes the challenger of that year. Then a 5-round match is held between the challenger and current title holder. If the challenger gets at least 3 points from 5 games, he wins the match and gains the Meijin title. Otherwise, the current holder keeps the title.

== Past winners ==
No.	Year	Winner	Result (Win-Draw-Loss)	Opponent
1	1962	Toshinori Yamakita	2-2-0	Masao Mitsumori
2	1963	Toshio Nishimura	3-1-1	Toshinori Yamakita
3	1964	Toshio Nishimura (2)	1-3-1	Taizan Isobe
4	1965	Taizan Isobe	3-0-2	Toshio Nishimura
5	1966	Taizan Isobe (2)	3-0-2	Toshio Nishimura
6	1967	Taizan Isobe (3)	3-0-0	Toshio Nishimura
7	1968	Toshio Nishimura (3)	3-0-2	Taizan Isobe
8	1969	Taizan Isobe (4)	3-0-0	Toshio Nishimura
9	1970	Taizan Isobe (5)	3-0-0	Toshio Nishimura
10	1971	Taizan Isobe (6)	1-3-1	Toshio Nishimura
11	1972	Taizan Isobe (7)	1-3-0	Toshio Nishimura
12	1973	Taizan Isobe (8)	2-1-1	Toshio Nishimura
13	1975	Shigeru Nakamura	3-1-0	Taizan Isobe
14	1976	Toshio Nishimura (4)	3-0-0	Shigeru Nakamura
15	1977	Shigeru Nakamura (2)	3-0-2	Toshio Nishimura
16	1978	Shigeru Nakamura (3)	2-1-1	Toshio Nishimura
17	1979	Shigeru Nakamura (4)	2-1-0	Hisashi Takahashi
18	1980	Atsushi Nishiyama	3-0-2	Shigeru Nakamura
19	1981	Shigeru Nakamura (5)	3-1-1	Atsushi Nisiyama
20	1982	Shigeru Nakamura (6)	2-1-0	Atsushi Nisiyama
21	1983	Shigeru Nakamura (7)	3-0-2	Shigeru Tomimori
22	1984	Shigeru Nakamura (8)	2-2-0	Shigeru Tomimori
23	1985	Shigeru Nakamura (9)	2-1-0	Takashi Sagara
24	1986	Shigeru Nakamura (10)	2-2-1	Takashi Sagara
25	1987	Shigeru Nakamura (11)	2-1-1	Norihiko Kawamura
26	1988	Shigeru Nakamura (12)	3-0-0	Kazuto Hasegawa
27	1989	Shigeru Nakamura (13)	2-1-1	Kazuto Hasegawa
28	1990	Shigeru Nakamura (14)	2-1-1	Kazuto Hasegawa
29	1991	Shigeru Nakamura (15)	3-0-0	Norihiko Kawamura
30	1992	Shigeru Nakamura (16)	2-1-1	Kazuto Hasegawa
31	1993	Shigeru Nakamura (17)	3-0-1	Norihiko Kawamura
32	1994	Norihiko Kawamura	3-0-2	Shigeru Nakamura
33	1995	Norihiko Kawamura (2)	3-0-0	Kazuto Hasegawa
34	1996	Kazuto Hasegawa	2-2-1	Norihiko Kawamura
35	1997	Shigeru Nakamura (18)	3-0-0	Kazuto Hasegawa
36	1998	Shigeru Nakamura (19)	2-1-0	Norio Nishizono
37	1999	Shigeru Nakamura (20)	2-1-0	Norihiko Kawamura
38	2000	Shigeru Nakamura (21)	2-1-0	Kazuto Hasegawa
39	2001	Shigeru Nakamura (22)	2-1-0	Kazuto Hasegawa
40	2002	Makoto Yamaguchi	3-0-1	Kazuto Hasegawa
41	2003	Makoto Yamaguchi (2)	3-0-2	Kazuto Hasegawa
42	2004	Norihiko Kawamura (3)	3-1-0	Makoto Yamaguchi
43	2005	Kazuto Hasegawa (2)	3-1-1	Norihiko Kawamura
44	2006	Kazuto Hasegawa (3)	2-1-0	Norihiko Kawamura
45	2007	Kazuto Hasegawa (4)	2-1-0	Yusui Yamaguchi
46	2008	Kazuto Hasegawa (5)	2-1-0	Hiroshi Okabe
47	2009	Kazuto Hasegawa (6)	2-1-1	Norihiko Kawamura
48	2010	Yuuki Oosumi	3-1-1	Kazuto Hasegawa
49	2011	Yuuki Oosumi (2)	2-1-1	Yusui Yamaguchi
50	2012	Shigeru Nakamura (23)	2-2-1	Yuuki Oosumi
51	2013	Shigeru Nakamura (24)	2-2-0	Yuuki Oosumi
52	2014	Shigeru Nakamura (25)	1-3-1	Yuuki Oosumi
53	2015	Shigeru Nakamura (26)	3-0-0	Kazuto Hasegawa
54	2016	Shigeru Nakamura (27)	2-1-0	Shunsuke Kamiya
55	2017	Tomoharu Nakayama	2-2-0	Shigeru Nakamura
56	2018	Shigeru Nakamura (28)	2-2-0	Tomoharu Nakayama
57	2019	Shigeru Nakamura (29)	2-1-1	Shunsuke Kamiya
58	2020	Shigeru Nakamura (30)	2-1-1	Tomoharu Nakayama
59	2021	Shunsuke Kamiya	1-4-0	Tomoharu Nakayama
60	2022	Shunsuke Kamiya (2)	2-1-0	Tomoharu Nakayama
61	2023	Shunsuke Kamiya (3)	3-0-0	Hiroshi Okabe
62	2024	Shunsuke Kamiya (4)	1-3-0	Hiroshi Okabe
63	2025	Shunsuke Kamiya (5)	3-0-0	Wang Qingqing

== Lifetime Meijin ==
Lifetime Meijin is a lifetime honorable title which is given to Japanese Renju players. Before the Meijin-sen tournaments were launched in 1962, the title of Lifetime Meijin was awarded to the players who had made outstanding contributions to the development of Renju. Since 1962, the title is awarded to the players who have outstanding performance in the Meijin-sen tournaments.

=== Before 1962 ===
Before the Meijin-sen tournaments were started, there were five Japanese players who were awarded the title of Lifetime Meijin.

- 1st: Goraku Takayama (Kuroiwa Ruikō)
- 2nd: Yūseki Mikami
- 3rd: Rakuzan Takagi
- 4th: Hōrō Yamakabe
- 5th: Gozui Sakata

=== After 1962 ===
After 1962, the title of Lifetime Meijin is awarded to the outstanding players who have won the Meijin title for at least 7 times in total, or 5 times in a row. A player who meets the above conditions can get this title when he is at least 60 years old.

Up to 2023, there are three players who have won this title is this way:

- 6th: Taizan Isobe
- 7th: Shigeru Nakamura
- 8th: Kazuto Hasegawa

In addition, there is also one player who has been qualified for this title, but not yet 60 years old.

- Shunsuke Kamiya (5 times in a row)

== See also ==
- Renju
- Gomoku
- World Championships in Renju
