= World Championships in Renju =

There are several world championships in Renju organized by the Renju International Federation, including World Championship, Women World Championships, Team World Championships, Youth World Championships and Correspondence World Championships.

== World Championships ==
Renju World Championships have occurred every second year, since 1989. The opening rule was Yamaguchi from 2009 to 2015, and was Soosõrv-8 from 2017 to 2023.

The results of previous World Championships are following:

Title year	Hosting city, country	Gold	Silver	Bronze	Opening rule
1989	Kyoto, Japan	(Japan) Shigeru Nakamura	(Japan) Hideki Nara	(Japan) Toshio Nishimura	Swap
1991	Moscow, Soviet Union	(Japan) Shigeru Nakamura	(Japan) Makoto Yamaguchi	(Soviet Union) Aldis Reims	Swap
1993	Arjeplog, Sweden	(Estonia) Ando Meritee	(Japan) Hideki Nara	(Latvia) Aldis Reims	Swap
1995	Tallinn, Estonia	(Japan) Norihiko Kawamura	(Estonia) Ando Meritee	(Russia) Dmitry Ilyin	Swap
1997	Saint Petersburg, Russia	(Japan) Kazuto Hasegawa	(Estonia) Ando Meritee	(Japan) Takashi Sagara	RIF
1999	Beijing, China	(Estonia) Ando Meritee	(Russia) Igor Sinyov	(Sweden) Stefan Karlsson	RIF
2001	Kyoto, Japan	(Estonia) Ando Meritee	(Russia) Vladimir Sushkov	(Russia) Igor Sinyov	RIF
2003	Vadstena, Sweden	(Estonia) Tunnet Taimla	(Russia) Vladimir Sushkov	(Estonia) Ando Meritee	RIF
2005	Tallinn, Estonia	(Estonia) Ando Meritee	(Russia) Vladimir Sushkov	(Russia) Konstantin Chingin	RIF
2007	Tyumen, Russia	(China) Wu Di	(Russia) Konstantin Chingin	(Japan) Yusui Yamaguchi	RIF
2009	Pardubice, Czech Republic	(Russia) Vladimir Sushkov	(Estonia) Tunnet Taimla	(China) Cao Dong	Yamaguchi
2011	Huskvarna, Sweden	(China) Cao Dong	(Chinese Taipei) Lin Huang-Yu	(China) Huang Jinxian	Yamaguchi
2013	Tallinn, Estonia	(Estonia) Tunnet Taimla	(Japan) Yuuki Oosumi	(Russia) Vladimir Sushkov	Yamaguchi
2015	Suzdal, Russia	(China) Qi Guan	(Chinese Taipei) Lin Huang-Yu	(China) Lan Zhiren	Yamaguchi
2017	Taipei, Taiwan	(Russia) Vladimir Sushkov	(China) Zhu Jianfeng	(Chinese Taipei) Lin Shu-Hsuan	Soosõrv-8
2019	Tallinn, Estonia	(China) Cao Dong	(Russia) Vladimir Sushkov	(Japan) Shunsuke Kamiya	Soosõrv-8
2023	Istanbul, Turkey	(China) Lu Hai	(China) Mei Fan	(Japan) Tomoharu Nakayama	Soosõrv-8
2025	Brno, Czech Republic	(Japan) Tomoharu Nakayama	(China) Mei Fan	(Japan) Shunsuke Kamiya	Taraguchi-10

The statistics for the players in the Renju World Championships following.

Place	Player	Gold	Silver	Bronze	Entries
1	(Estonia) Ando Meritee	4	2	1	7
2	(Russia) Vladimir Sushkov	2	4	1	10
3	(Estonia) Tunnet Taimla	2	1	0	7
4	(China) Cao Dong	2	0	1	6
5	(Japan) Shigeru Nakamura	2	0	0	4
6	(Japan) Tomoharu Nakayama	1	0	1	4
7	(Japan) Kazuto Hasegawa	1	0	0	5
8	(Japan) Norihiko Kawamura	1	0	0	2
8	(China) Lu Hai	1	0	0	2
8	(China) Qi Guan	1	0	0	2
8	(China) Wu Di	1	0	0	2
12	(Japan) Hideki Nara	0	2	0	6
13	(Japan) Mei Fan	0	2	0	4
14	(Chinese Taipei) Lin Huang-Yu	0	2	0	3
15	(Russia) Igor Sinyov	0	1	1	5
16	(Russia) Konstantin Chingin	0	1	1	3
16	(Japan) Yusui Yamaguchi	0	1	1	3
18	(Japan) Yuuki Oosumi	0	1	0	2
19	(China) Zhu Jianfeng	0	1	0	1
20	(Japan) Shunsuke Kamiya	0	0	2	4
20	(Latvia) Aldis Reims	0	0	2	4
22	(Sweden) Stefan Karlsson	0	0	1	8
23	(Japan) Takashi Sagara	0	0	1	3
24	(China) Lan Zhiren	0	0	1	2
25	(China) Huang Jinxian	0	0	1	1
25	(Russia) Dmitry Ilyin	0	0	1	1
25	(Chinese Taipei) Lin Shu-Hsuan	0	0	1	1
25	(Japan) Toshio Nishimura	0	0	1	1

== Women World Championships ==
The Women World Championships started in 1997 and are played every second year, at the same time and place with the World Championships. The results are following:

Title year	Hosting city, country	Gold	Silver	Bronze	Opening rule
1997	Saint Petersburg, Russia	(Russia) Irina Metreveli	(Russia) Natalya Vasilyeva	(Russia) Yelena Lebedeva	RIF
1999	Beijing, China	(Russia) Yulia Savrasova	(Russia) Irina Metreveli	(Russia) Yelena Lebedeva	RIF
2001	Kyoto, Japan	(Russia) Yulia Savrasova	(Russia) Irina Metreveli	(Chinese Taipei) Hsu Wen-Ching	RIF
2003	Vadstena, Sweden	(Russia) Yulia Savrasova	(Chinese Taipei) Yang Hsiao-Yu	(Russia) Irina Metreveli	RIF
2005	Tallinn, Estonia	(Russia) Oxana Sorokina	(Russia) Irina Metreveli	(Estonia) Maris Tuvikene	RIF
2007	Tyumen, Russia	(Russia) Tatyana Krayeva	(Russia) Oxana Sorokina	(Russia) Irina Metreveli	RIF
2009	Pardubice, Czech Republic	(Russia) Yulia Savrasova	(China) Yao Jinrui	(China) Hu Xi	Yamaguchi
2011	Huskvarna, Sweden	(Japan) Kazumi Arai	(Russia) Irina Metreveli	(Russia) Anastasja Oborina	Yamaguchi
2013	Tallinn, Estonia	(Russia) Irina Metreveli	(Russia) Kira Lashko	(Russia) Olga Kurdina	Yamaguchi
2015	Suzdal, Russia	(Russia) Kira Lashko	(China) Wang Qingqing	(Russia) Irina Metreveli	Yamaguchi
2017	Taipei, Taiwan	(Chinese Taipei) Chien Yung-Hsuan	(China) Wang Qingqing	(China) Liu Xun	Soosõrv-8
2019	Tallinn, Estonia	(China) Wu Zhiqin	(China) Li Xiaoqing	(Russia) Irina Metreveli	Soosõrv-8
2023	Istanbul, Turkey	(China) Wang Qingqing	Ekaterina Porokhina (Note: According to the protocol of the Renju International Federation in 2022, Russian players would play under the Russian Renju Association and would not be using Russian flags.)	(Japan) Maiko Fujita	Soosõrv-8
2025	Brno, Czech Republic	(China) Wang Qingqing	(China) Wan Junhong	(China) Shen Lanxin	Taraguchi-10

== Team World Championships ==
Team World Championships in Renju have occurred every second year since 1996, except for 2020. From 2010 to 2016, the opening rule was Yamaguchi. In 2018, the opening rule was Soosõrv-8. Since 2024, the opening rule has become Taraguchi-10. The results are following.

Title year	Hosting city, country	Gold	Silver	Bronze
1996	Saint Petersburg, Russia	Russia; Dmitry Ilyin; Stepan Peskov; Igor Sinyov; Konstantin Nikonov; Mikhail Kozhin	Estonia; Ando Meritee; Ants Soosõrv; Margus Tuvikene; Marek Kolk	Latvia; Aldis Reims; Arnis Veidemanis; Nerses Grigorian; Eduard Voskanian
1998 (Note: In this year an Armenia-Sweden match was played instead of Team World Championship. The result is a draw between the two teams, but no champion title was awarded.)	Yerevan, Armenia	No champion title awarded		
2000	Tallinn, Estonia	Russia-1; Igor Sinyov; Alexandr Klimashin; Vladimir Sushkov; Pavel Salnikov; Mikhail Kozhin	Sweden; Stefan Karlsson; Rickard Johannesson; Joachim Gaulitz; Tord Andersson	Japan; Kazuto Hasegawa; Hideki Nara; Yoshimi Hayakawa; Hirouji Sakamoto
2002	Vadstena, Sweden	Russia-1; Pavel Salnikov; Alexandr Klimashin; Sergey Artemyev; Alexey Skuridin; Vladimir Semyonov	Estonia; Ants Soosõrv; Tunnet Taimla; Johann Lents; Timo Ilu; Maris Tuvikene	Sweden-1; Stefan Karlsson; Peter Gardstrom; Goran Holgersson; Linus Hermansson; Joachim Gaulitz
2004	Tyumen, Russia	Russia-1; Vladimir Sushkov; Alexandr Klimashin; Konstantin Chingin; Konstantin Nikonov; Igor Sinyov	Estonia; Ando Meritee; Tunnet Taimla; Ants Soosõrv; Timo Ilu; Irene Karlsson	Russia-2; Pavel Salnikov; Pavel Makarov; Sergey Artemyev; Vladimir Semyonov; Mikhail Kozhin
2006	Tallinn, Estonia	Russia-1; Vladimir Sushkov; Konstantin Chingin; Sergey Artemyev; Yulia Savrasova; Pavel Vershinin	Estonia-1; Ando Meritee; Tunnet Taimla; Ants Soosõrv; Aivo Oll; Johann Lents	China; Chen Wei; Wu Hao; Zhu Jianfeng; Ge Lingfeng
2008	Helsinki, Finland	Estonia; Tunnet Taimla; Aivo Oll; Andry Purk; Ants Soosõrv; Johann Lents	Russia-1; Vladimir Sushkov; Egor Serdyukov; Konstantin Chingin; Yulia Savrasova; Alexandr Kadulin	China; Cao Dong; Wu Di; Wu Hao; Chen Wei
2010	Tokyo, Japan	China; Li Yi; Cao Dong; Yin Licheng; Xi Zhenyang	Estonia-1; Tunnet Taimla; Aivo Oll; Andry Purk; Ants Soosõrv	Japan-1; Shigeru Nakamura; Kazuto Hasegawa; Hiroshi Okabe; Yusui Yamaguchi; Norihiko Kawamura; Taizan Isobe
2012	Beijing, China	Japan; Yuuki Oosumi; Shigeru Nakamura; Takahiro Kudomi; Kazumasa Tamura; Hiroshi Okabe; Tomoharu Nakayama	China-1; Cao Dong; Zhu Jianfeng; He Qifa; Lu Hai	China-2; Yang Yanxi; Chen Jing; Qi Guan; Chen Wei
2014	Taipei, Taiwan	Estonia; Tunnet Taimla; Martin Hõbemägi; Ants Soosõrv; Johann Lents; Ando Meritee	Chinese Taipei-1; Lin Shu-Hsuan; Lin Huang-Yu; Chen Ko-Han; Yang Yu-Hsiung; Lin Shih-Pin; Cheng Chih-Liang	Japan-1; Shigeru Nakamura; Yoshihiro Iio; Nobuhiro Fukui; Ayako Tada; Yuuki Oosumi; Kazumasa Tamura
2016	Tallinn, Estonia	Estonia-1; Aivo Oll; Tunnet Taimla; Martin Hõbemägi; Renee Pajuste; Johann Lents	China; Qi Guan; Lan Zhiren; Zhu Jianfeng; Chen Xin; Liu Yang	Russia-1; Oleg Fedorkin; Vladimir Sushkov; Pavel Salnikov; Konstantin Nikonov; Dmitry Epifanov; Maxim Karasyov
2018	Saint Petersburg, Russia	China; Yang Yanxi; Zhu Jianfeng; Cao Dong; Liu Yang; Lan Zhiren	Japan; Tomoharu Nakayama; Yudai Fujita; Yoshihiro Iio; Jun Koyama; Hiroshi Okabe; Maiko Fujita	Russia-2; Vladimir Sushkov; Pavel Salnikov; Mikhail Kozhin; Denis Kachaev; Maxim Karasyov; Sergey Artemyev
2024	Xintai, China	China-2; Huang Liqin; Cao Dong; Jiang Qiwen; He Shujun; Ai Xianping	China-1; Mei Fan; Huang Shengming; Chen Xin; Wu Di; Lu Hai	China-3; Wang Qingqing; Liu Xun; Liu Qin; Huang Xiangning; Wan Junhong
2026	Yerevan, Armenia	China-2; He Shujun; Mao Weiming; Li Haoran; Zhang Yifeng; Ling Shijie	China-1; Huang Shengming; Ai Xianping; Liu Yang; Li Dong; Zhu Jianfeng	Japan; Hiroshi Okabe; Takahisa Kawano; Masaya Tachi; Shorato Tanaka; Nobuhiro Fukui; Fumiya Inoue

The statistics for the Renju Team World Championships following.

Place	Team	Gold	Silver	Bronze	Entries
1	Russia	5	1	3	11
2	Estonia	3	5	0	11
3	China	2	2	3	7
4	Japan	1	1	3	11
5	Sweden	0	1	1	9
6	Chinese Taipei	0	1	0	4
7	Latvia	0	0	1	1

== Youth World Championships ==
Renju Youth World Championships have occurred every second year since 1996.

The results of Youth World Championships of different groups for boys are following:

Title year	Hosting city, country	U25	U23	U20	U18	U17	U15	U14	U12	U11	U9
1996	Nizhny Novgorod, Russia	-			(Estonia) Margus Tuvikene			(Russia) Konstantin Chingin			
1998	Beijing, China	-			(Sweden) Hannes Hermansson			(China) Shao Xiaodong			
2000	Arjeplog, Sweden	-			(Russia) Konstantin Chingin			(Russia) Denis Nekrasov			
2002	Podyuga, Russia	-		(Russia) Konstantin Chingin				(Estonia) Tunnet Taimla			
2004	Yerevan, Armenia	-		(Japan) Hiroshi Okabe				(Russia) Evgeny Sumarokov			
2006	Beijing, China	-	(China) Wu Hao			(Russia) Mikhail Lysakov			(China) Hu Yu		
2008	Haapsalu, Estonia	-	(Estonia) Aivo Oll			(Russia) Alexandr Kadulin			(Estonia) Martin Hõbemägi		
2010	Yerevan, Armenia	-	(Armenia) Rafik Nersisyan			(Russia) Artyom Merkulov			(Russia) Aleksey Vostryakov		
2012	Suzdal, Russia	-	(Russia) Artyom Merkulov			(Russia) Roman Kruchok			(Russia) Denis Fedotov		
2014	Suure-Jaani, Estonia	-	(Estonia) Martin Hõbemägi			(Russia) Denis Fedotov			(China) Tang Xudong		
2016	Tallinn, Estonia	(Estonia) Martin Hõbemägi		(Estonia) Georg-Romet Topkin			(Russia) Denis Fedotov			(China) Fan Shihao	
2018	Kuşadası, Turkey	(Estonia) Martin Hõbemägi		(Russia) Maksim Lavrik-Karmazin			(China) Kang Zheming			(China) Zhang Junyu	
2024	Ulaanbaatar, Mongolia	(South Korea) Kang Sang-min					(China) Wu Yanwei			Sergey Mikryukov (Note: According to the protocol of the Renju International Federation in 2022, Russian players would play under the Russian Renju Association and would not be using Russian flags.)	

The results of Youth World Championships of different groups for girls are following:

Title year	Hosting city, country	U25	U23	U20	U18	U17	U15	U14	U12	U11	U9
1996	Nizhny Novgorod, Russia	-			(Russia) Yelena Lebedeva						
1998	Beijing, China	-			(Russia) Yelena Lebedeva			(China) Wu Dan			
2000	Arjeplog, Sweden	-			(Russia) Yelena Lebedeva			(Russia) Yulia Savrasova			
2002	Podyuga, Russia	-		(Russia) Yulia Savrasova				(Russia) Alyona Mikhailova			
2004	Yerevan, Armenia	-		(Russia) Yulia Savrasova				(Russia) Mariya Pestereva			
2006	Beijing, China	-	(Russia) Yulia Savrasova			(Russia) Tatyana Krayeva			(Russia) Anastasja Oborina		
2008	Haapsalu, Estonia	-	(Russia) Yulia Savrasova			(Russia) Tatyana Krayeva			(Russia) Alexandra Sumarokova		
2010	Yerevan, Armenia	-	(Armenia) Gayane Petrosyan			(Russia) Anastasja Oborina			(Russia) Kira Lashko		
2012	Suzdal, Russia	-	(Russia) Tatyana Krayeva			(Russia) Anastasja Oborina			(Estonia) Tuuli Tiivel		
2014	Suure-Jaani, Estonia	-	(China) Wang Qingqing			(China) Jin Yichan			(China) Fan Xuanzuo		
2016	Tallinn, Estonia	(China) Wang Qingqing		(Russia) Kira Lashko			(Russia) Ksenia Matushkina			(China) Lou Qiongwen	
2018	Kuşadası, Turkey	(China) Liu Xun		(Russia) Tatyana Prokopets			(China) Xu Xicheng			(China) Wang Kemiao	
2024	Ulaanbaatar, Mongolia	Anna Fokicheva (Note: According to the protocol of the Renju International Federation in 2022, Russian players would play under the Russian Renju Association and would not be using Russian flags.)					(China) Deng Yuanxi			(China) Zhang Yan	(China) Cao Xinyu

== Renju World Championships via Correspondence ==
World Championships in Renju via Correspondence were held in 1982 to 1993 (by paper letters, later by e-mails), and now are played every year since 1996 with an exception in 2009, 2010 and 2016. The opening rule being played is Soosõrv-N from 2014 to 2020, and was changed to Taraguchi-10 since 2021.

The results from 1982 to 1993 are in the following.

Title year	Champion	Country
1982	Vladimir Sapronov	Soviet Union
1984	Alexandr Nosovsky	Soviet Union
1985	Alexandr Nosovsky	Soviet Union
1991	Albert Poghosyan	Soviet Union
1993	Albert Poghosyan	Armenia

The results since 1996 are in the following.

Title year	Champion	Runner-up	Third
1996	(Latvia) Aldis Reims	(Lithuania) Linas Laibinis	(Russia) Igor Sinyov
1997	(Russia) Yuriy Tarannikov	(Latvia) Aldis Reims	(Sweden) Stefan Karlsson
1998	(Russia) Oleg Fedorkin	(Latvia) Aldis Reims	(Japan) Kazuto Hasegawa
1999	(Russia) Oleg Fedorkin	(Russia) Alexander Nosovsky	(Russia) Konstantin Nikonov
2000	(Latvia) Aldis Reims	(Russia) Evgeniy Bobkov	(Russia) Konstantin Nikonov
2001	(Russia) Konstantin Nikonov	(China) Zhang Jinyu	(Russia) Vitaly Lunkin
2002	(Russia) Vitaly Lunkin	(China) Zhang Jinyu	(Russia) Vladimir Dvoeglazov
2003	(China) Chen Wei	(Russia) Sergey Filippov	(Russia) Oleg Klimachev
2004	(China) Sun Chengmin	(Russia) Alexey Potapov	(China) Chen Wei
2005	(Russia) Victor Barykin	(China) Zhang Jinyu	(China) Lu Wenzhe
2006	No gold awarded	(Russia) Dmitry Epifanov	(Russia) Victor Barykin
2007	(Russia) Dmitry Epifanov	(China) Zhang Jinyu	(Russia) Anatoly Ustimov
2008	(China) Zhang Jinyu	(Latvia) Jelena Balanova	(Russia) Alexey Potapov
2011	(Latvia) Jelena Balanova	(Estonia) Aivo Oll	(Russia) Alexey Potapov
2012	(Russia) Alexey Potapov	(Latvia) Jelena Balanova	(Estonia) Aivo Oll
2013	(Russia) Vladimir Sushkov	(Russia) Alexey Potapov	(Russia) Viktor Balabhai
2014	(Russia) Vladimir Sushkov	(Russia) Evgeniy Bobkov	(Russia) Oleg Fedorkin
2015	(Russia) Konstantin Nikonov	(Russia) Oleg Fedorkin	(Russia) Pavel Makarov
2017	(China) Hao Tianyi	(China) Qi Bo	(Russia) Dmitry Epifanov
2018	(China) Hao Tianyi	(Russia) Dmitry Epifanov	(Russia) Vladimir Filinov
2019	(China) Wang Qichao	(Russia) Vladimir Sushkov	(Estonia) Aivo Oll
2020	(Estonia) Aivo Oll	(China) Qiu Weifu	(Russia) Vladimir Sushkov
2021	(China) Yao Yujie	(China) Qian Yunbing	(Estonia) Aivo Oll
2022	(China) Yao Yujie	(Estonia) Aivo Oll	(Russia) Vladimir Filinov
2023	(Estonia) Aivo Oll	(China) Ni Zhongxing	(Russia) Valery Koreshkov
2024	(China) Ni Zhongxing	(China) Jin Rui	(China) Su Baowen

== See also ==
- Renju
- Renju International Federation
- RIF rating list
