= European Renju Championship =

The European Renju Championship is an official Renju championship organized by the Renju International Federation (RIF). It was started in 1994.

== History ==
The first European Championship was held in 1994 in Tallinn, Estonia. In 1995, it was decided by the General Assembly of the Renju International Federation (RIF) that the European Championships would be held regularly. In the same year, the 2nd European Championship was held in Saint Petersburg, Russia. Since 1996, the European Championship was changed to happen once every two years.

== Tournament system ==
Over the years, the tournament was held in different ways. In 1994 and 1995, the Swiss system was used. In 1996, there were two groups, after which the winner was determined by the semifinal and final matches. A similar regulation with only one group was applied until 2002. From then, the Swiss system was used in a long time. In 2016, a round-robin system with final matches was applied.

== Places and winners ==
No.	Year	Hosting city	Winner	Runner-up	Third
1	1994	Tallinn, Estonia	(Latvia) Arnis Veidemanis	(Russia) Stepan Peskov	(Russia) Igor Sinyov
2	1995	Saint Petersburg, Russia	(Russia) Alexandr Klimashin	(Russia) Mikhail Kozhin	(Russia) Vladimir Semyonov
3	1996	Stockholm, Sweden	(Estonia) Ando Meritee	(Latvia) Aldis Reims	(Russia) Igor Sinyov
4	1998	Tallinn, Estonia	(Estonia) Ando Meritee	(Russia) Vladimir Sushkov	(Estonia) Ants Soosõrv
5	2000	Zhovti Vody, Ukraine	(Russia) Alexandr Klimashin	(Estonia) Ants Soosõrv	(Sweden) Stefan Karlsson
6	2002	Karepa, Estonia	(Russia) Igor Sinyov	(Estonia) Tunnet Taimla	(Russia) Pavel Makarov
7	2004	Podyuga, Russia	(Russia) Alexandr Kadulin	(Estonia) Johann Lents	(Russia) Pavel Vershinin
8	2006	Havlíčkův Brod, Czech Republic	(Estonia) Ando Meritee	(Russia) Alexandr Kadulin	(Estonia) Ants Soosõrv
9	2008	Saint Petersburg, Russia	(Estonia) Aivo Oll	(Russia) Sergey Artemyev	(Estonia) Tunnet Taimla
10	2010	Karepa, Estonia	(Russia) Maxim Karasyov	(Estonia) Tunnet Taimla	(Russia) Mikhail Kozhin
11	2012	Suzdal, Russia	(Russia) Oleg Fedorkin	(Estonia) Ants Soosõrv	(Russia) Yuriy Tarannikov
12	2014	Tallinn, Estonia	(Estonia) Ants Soosõrv	(Estonia) Martin Hõbemägi	(Russia) Pavel Makarov
13	2016	Tashkent, Uzbekistan	(Russia) Dmitry Epifanov	(Estonia) Johann Lents (Note: With the actual 3rd place, as Wang Qingqing, the representative of China, took the 2nd place.)	(Estonia) Tunnet Taimla (Note: With the actual 4th place, as Wang Qingqing, the representative of China, took the 2nd place.)
14	2018	Tallinn, Estonia	(Russia) Denis Fedotov	(Estonia) Aivo Oll	(Estonia) Martin Hõbemägi (Note: With the actual 4th place, as Wang Qingqing, the representative of China, took the 3nd place.)
15	2022	Çanakkale, Turkey	Vladimir Sushkov (Note: According to the protocol of the Renju International Federation in 2022, Russian players would play under the Russian Renju Association and would not be using Russian flags.)	Dmitry Epifanov	(Estonia) Aivo Oll
16	2024	Yerevan, Armenia	Ivan Danilin	(Estonia) Villem Mesila	Pavel Makarov
