= Soosõrv opening rule =

Renju opening rule

The Soosõrv opening rule is a renju opening rule. It was proposed by Estonian player Ants Soosõrv.

== Rule details ==
The sequence of moves implied by the rule follows.

- The first player puts one of the 26 openings.
- The other player has the right to swap.
- The white player puts the 4th move anywhere on board and declares whether there will be 1, 2, 3 or 4 fifth moves offered in the game.
- The other player has a right to swap.
- The black player puts as many 5th moves on the board as it was declared before. The fifth moves can not be symmetrical.
- The white player chooses one 5th from these offerings and plays the 6th move.

== Brief description ==
This rule gives an average variety of new playable variants in a good number of openings, especially white-oriented, but openings that are very strong for black (like 2D, 2I, 4I, 7I, 4D etc.) don't become playable. To solve this problem the Soosõrv-N advancement was proposed and certified by RIF.

== Advancement ==
Soosõrv-N opening rule is an advancement of Soosõrv opening rule. When the white player puts the 4th move and declares the number of fifth moves, the number has to be not less than 1 and not greater than N, instead of the default value 4 for N in the original Soosõrv opening rule.

Depending on the value of N this rule gives an average to big variety of new playable variants in a growing number of openings. Soosõrv-5 is very close to Taraguchi concerning a number of playable positions. Soosõrv-8 makes all 26 renju openings available.

== Tournaments played by this rule ==
Soosõrv opening rule was an official opening rule for European Renju Championship in 2008 and a couple of minor international tournaments.

Soosõrv-N opening rule was certified by Renju International Federation in 2011 after a proposal from Russian Renju Association. In 2015, Soosõrv-8 opening rule was decided to be the opening rule for the Renju World Championship since 2017.
