= Go-Moku / Renju =

1988 video game

- Developer: Atari
- Publisher: Atari
- Series: Atari Mindgames
- Platform: Atari ST
- Release: 1988
- Genre: Virtual board game
- Mode: Single-player

Go-Moku / Renju is a 1988 video game published by Atari (UK) Ltd.

== Gameplay ==
Go-Moku / Renju is a game in which go-moku and its more sophisticated version renju are played on a grid using black and white counters.

This game was part of Atari's Mindgames Series.

== Reception ==
Reception

Review score
| Publication | Score |
|---|---|
| The Games Machine (UK) | 64% |

Steve Nichols reviewed Go-Moku & Renju for Games International magazine, and gave it 3 stars out of 5, and stated that "if you have tremendous reserves of patience and are willing to put up with the glitches, it is worth a look."

The Games Machine said that the range of possibilities make the game "insanely addictive and enjoyable in many ways more subtle than chess — and the computer adversary is useful" but cautioned that the actual board game is more affordable.

Pat Winstanley for Atari ST User found that "While the game is fun to play, easy to learn, but frustratingly difficult to win", he felt that the price was high and would have worked better as a budget game.

John Sweeney for Page 6 found the game "good fun" with the variable size of the board, concluding that it "will give you many hours of enjoyment".
