= Tunnet Taimla =

Estonian Renju player (1988–2023)

Personal information
- Born: 21 June 1988 Viljandi, then part of Estonian SSR, Soviet Union
- Died: 9 February 2023 (aged 34)
- Years active: 1995 — 2023

Sport
- Country: Estonia
- Sport: Renju
- Rank: 8 dan
- Coached by: Ants Soosõrv

Achievements and titles
- World finals: World Renju Championship 2003 – Gold; World Renju Championship 2009 – Silver; World Renju Championship 2013 – Gold
- Regional finals: European Renju Championship 2002 – Silver; European Renju Championship 2008 – Bronze; European Renju Championship 2010 – Silver; European Renju Championship 2016 – Bronze
- Updated on 15 February 2023

Tunnet Taimla (21 June 1988 – 9 February 2023) was an Estonian Renju player.

== Career ==
Taimla started to play Renju in 1995 at the age of 7. After four years of studying, he won the Youth European Championship (1999) among boys 14 years and under. Later, he won the Youth European Championship twice, in 2001 (among boys 14 years and under) and in 2005 (among boys 18 years and under). In 2002 he achieved the title of Youth World Champion (among boys 14 years and under).

Since childhood he has taken part in adult tournaments as well, eventually managing to achieve significant results. In 2002 he took part in the Team World Championship as a member of Estonian team which scored 2nd place. Several months later he took part in a European Renju Championship (2002) and achieved silver medal.

In 2003 he qualified to the final stage of Renju World Championship AT and won it, thus becoming individual World Champion. He participated in several World Championships later achieving 2nd place in 2009. Since 2002, he became a constant member of Estonian team on Team World Championships. In 2013, he won the Renju World Championship AT for the second time.

As a member of Estonian team he has won bronze (2010), four silver medal places (2002, 2004, 2006, 2010) and three gold medal places 2008, 2014, 2016 in Team World Championships.

In 2019, Taimla became the first foreigner to win The 4th Chinese National Mind Sports Olympiade Games of China as a Hubei Province team coach.

In 2022, Taimla was elected vice-president of the Renju International Federation.

Taimla died on 9 February 2023 at the age of 34.
