= Taraguchi opening rule =

Taraguchi opening rule is a renju opening rule. It was proposed by Yusui Yamaguchi as an advancement of a Tarannikov opening rule and therefore it was named with a combination of these two names. It has an enhancement, Taraguchi-N opening rule.

== Rule details ==
- The black player puts the first move in the center of the board.
- The other player may swap.
- The white player will put the 2nd move within 3x3 central square.
- The other player may swap.
- The black player will put the 3rd move within 5x5 central square.
- The other player may swap.
- The white player will put the 4th move within 7x7 central square.

The choice 1 (after the 4th move):

- The other player may swap.
- The black player will put the 5th move within 9x9 central square.
- The other player may swap.
- The white player plays the 6th move anywhere on board.

The choice 2 (after the 4th move):

- The black player puts five 5th moves anywhere on board (symmetrical moves are not allowed).
- The white player chooses one of the offered 5th moves and plays the 6th move anywhere on board.

== Brief description ==
This rule offers a good variety of playable variants in the openings that aren't playable by Yamaguchi opening rule like 13D, 13I, 12D, 10D.

On the other hand, this rule limits playable openings to those that don't have five winning fifth moves, so 2D, 2I and some other openings become unavailable. The Taraguchi-N opening rule solves this problem.

== Advancement ==
Taraguchi-N opening rule is an advancement of Taraguchi opening rule. After the white player puts the 4th move, the black player can put N alternative 5th moves anywhere on the board (instead of the default N=5 in the original Taraguchi rule).

Compared to the default Taraguchi opening rule, this rule limits playable openings to those which don't have N winning 5th moves. Having N big enough (10 for instance) all the playable 5-move positions are available.

Taraguchi-N opening rule was accepted by the Renju International Federation (RIF) in 2011 in the General Assembly.

== Tournaments played by this rule ==
This opening rule is official opening rule for Renju World Championship via Correspondence being held in 2012, European Championships since 2010 and some minor international tournaments.
