= Sergey Kashintsev =

Executed Soviet serial killer

- Born: Sergey Alexandrovich Kashintsev; 9 August 1940; Podyuga, Arkhangelsk Oblast, RSFSR, Soviet Union
- Died: 17 January 1992 (aged 51); Russia
- Cause of death: Execution by shooting
- Other names: "The Lame Killer" "The Cane Killer" "The Limping Wretch"
- Status: Executed
- Convictions: Murder x8 Theft x2
- Penalty: 10 years imprisonment (first murder); Death (latter murders)

Details
- Victims: 8–59
- Span of crimes: 1975; 1985 – 1987
- Country: Soviet Union
- States: Volgograd, Chelyabinsk, Kirov, Nizhny Novgorod, Ryazan (others confessed)
- Date apprehended: 28 April 1987

Sergey Alexandrovich Kashintsev (Russian: Сергей Александрович Кашинцев; 9 August 1940 – 17 January 1992) was a Soviet serial killer. Originally convicted of a single murder in 1975, he was later released and committed at least seven additional killings across the country. Following his arrest, he confessed to a total of 59 murders and 3 attempted murders he had supposedly done from 1985 to 1987, most of which remain unverified.

He was sentenced to death for his confirmed crimes in 1990, and subsequently executed two years later.

== Early life ==
Sergey Alexandrovich Kashintsev was born on 9 August 1940, in the village of Podyuga, Arkhangelsk Oblast, RSFSR. He was born with a defect which caused his right leg to be shorter than the left one, due to which he had to walk with a cane and was constantly mocked by his peers. He began displaying aggressive behaviour early on in life and started committing small crimes, with his outbursts growing so bad that even his own mother was afraid of him. Kashintsev refused to study or work and frequently ran away from home, and in 1955, he molested a young girl by luring her into a bathhouse and convincing her to undress for him.

== Early crimes, first murder, and imprisonment ==
Kashintsev's first criminal convictions were for two thefts, one of which was for stealing an overcoat from his brother, Nikolai. After his release, he moved into the apartment of an acquaintance, Ostapchuk, in Kalach-na-Donu, where he soon found a job at a boiler room but quit only months later. He eventually started extorting his landlady for money, sometimes resorting to beating and even strangling her. In the early 1970s, he was convicted of public indecency and property damage and had a short stint in prison.

In 1975, Kashintsev was arrested and subsequently charged with killing a woman named Korotkova in Kalach-na-Donu. The psychiatric examination concluded that while he showed psychopathic traits, he was sane and did not suffer from any mental abnormalities. However, as the killing was done in a state of intoxication, Kashintsev was instead sentenced to 10 years imprisonment at a local penal colony.

He proved to be a troublesome inmate, as he systematically refused to work; organized gambling events; had quarrels with other convicts; extorted others for medicine and wrote unfounded complaints. Kashintsev was described as withdrawn and very aggressive, and categorically refused to interact both with other convicts and his family members. In addition, he was particularly hostile towards the female personnel of the medical unit, and once openly proclaimed that he would "have his revenge" when he was released. In contrast to his volatile personality, staff at the penal colony noted that he was addicted to reading textbooks about human anatomy, physiology, legal literature and forensics, which went into great detail about how authorities operated. Some convicts even complained that Kashintsev hoarded some of the textbooks, as he often re-read them several times.

== Release and serial murders ==
In 1985, Kashintsev was released from prison after serving out the entirety of his sentence. After being outcast by fellow homeless people due to his anger and drinking issues, he began travelling around the country via trains, spending most of his free time conversing with women who were prone to drinking or were beggars. His modus operandi consisted of inviting them for a drink at an isolated area and offering to have sex with them - if the prospective victim refused, he would instead rape her before resorting to either beating, strangling or choking her to death using whatever he had on hand.

His first confirmed murder occurred on 25 July 1985, in Chelyabinsk, when he met 34-year-old Larkova and offered her to have a drink with her. After drinking alcohol together, they snuck into the studio building of the regional Glinka Opera and Ballet Theater, hiding in an area which was still under construction. While there, Kashintsev decided to kill his companion, tearing off her clothes and beating her with his fists and a stick before ultimately strangling her with his bare hands.

On 8 January 1986, Kashintsev met 57-year-old Fyodorova at the railroad station in Kirov, and decided to invite her over to the apartment of some acquaintances. When night came and everybody was asleep, he grabbed the woman by the neck and dragged her to the bathtub, where he bashed her head against the edge. After she fell down, he proceeded to strangle Fyodorova before picking up a rasp and repeatedly striking her to death with it.

All of his subsequent crimes followed a similar pattern. On several occasions, innocent people would be questioned and detained for crimes he had committed: the best-known example was the murder of 29-year-old kindergarten guard Tamara Gatilova in Arzamas, for which three teenagers were initially arrested. The trio were tortured into confessing by police officers, but after a long trial, their innocence was eventually proven and they were released without charges. Aside from this, many victims remained unaccounted for due to their lifestyles and they were found long after they had died. Due to the passage of time and lack of clues, their deaths were erroneously attributed to natural causes, accidents or alcohol poisoning.

== Arrest, trial and execution ==
On 28 April 1987, railroad workers working on a route between Ryazhsk and Alexandro-Nevsky in Ryazan Oblast noticed Kashintsev in the vicinity of a woman lying on the ground. Initially believing that she was asleep, the workers later approached her out of curiosity, only to realize that she was dead. They informed authorities, who found Kashintsev sleeping only 300 metres away and promptly arrested him.

During the interrogation, Kashintsev, in an attempt to present himself as insane, started randomly confessing to a total of 59 murders, including ones in which he had no involvement. Most of his claims were investigated and cleared, and he was ultimately indicted for seven murders and three attempted murders. He was sent for a psychiatric evaluation at the Voronezh Regional Clinical Psychiatric Hospital, where it was revealed that he had suffered some organic brain damage, manifested in the form of a psychopathic syndrome. However, psychiatrists ultimately concluded that this did not affect his ability to differentiate right from wrong, with his only credible excuse being that he was drunk at the time. As a result, he was legally sane and put on trial.

On 13 March 1990, Kashintsev was convicted on all counts and sentenced to death for the seven murders. He was promptly shot on 17 January 1992, in an undisclosed prison within the newly-formed Russia.

== In the media and culture ==
His case has been covered by two prominent true crime television shows

- The Investigation was conducted... - The Lame Killer
- Legends of the Soviet detective - A man with a cane

== See also ==
- List of Russian serial killers
