= I-Chen Wu =

I-Chen Wu (Chinese: 吳毅成; pinyin: Wú Yìchéng) is a professor at Department of Computer Science, National Chiao Tung University. He received his B.S. in Electronic Engineering from National Taiwan University (NTU), M.S. in computer science from NTU, and Ph.D. in computer science from Carnegie-Mellon University, in 1982, 1984 and 1993, respectively.

Wu invented a new game, named Connect6, a variation of the five-in-a-row game, and presented this game in the 11th Advances in Computer Games Conference (ACG'11) in 2005. The game-tree complexity of this game is quite high, close to Chinese Chess. Since presented in 2005, Connect6 has been a tournament item in Computer Olympiad. He wrote a program, named NCTU6, and won the gold in the tournament in 2006. Up to date, there have been at least four game websites supporting this game, at least 10 web forums for this game (in Traditional Chinese, Simplified Chinese, English, Spanish and multi-lingual), hundreds of thousands games played over the Internet, several Josekis (opening moves) and Tsumegos (like puzzles) developed, and one human Connect6 open tournament held in Summer 2006.

Wu also developed a game platform over Internet and actively participated in software development leading a team to major software components and framework in both clients and servers. In the client side, the team led by him developed a portable AWT/Swing architecture for Java game development, which has been used in some game companies including Sina Inc., Hinet, and ThinkNewIdea Inc., in Taiwan.
