= Cao Dong (renju player) =

Chinese Renju player

Cao Dong (Chinese: 曹冬, born 4 December 1982) is a Chinese Renju player. He won the Renju World Championship in 2011 and 2019, and the Renju Team World Championship in 2010 and 2018. Up to 2022, Cao Dong has won the Chinese National Renju Championship for 4 times and the Chinese National Team Renju Championship for 4 times.
