= Shigeru Nakamura =

Shigeru Nakamura may refer to:

- Shigeru Nakamura (renju player) (中村 茂, born 1959), Japanese Renju player
- Shigeru Nakamura (karate instructor) (1894–1969), Japanese karate instructor
- Shigeru Nakamura (1911–2022), Japanese supercentenarian
