= Swap opening rule =

Swap opening rule is a renju opening rule. It was adopted by RIF in the late 80s and was an official rule for Renju World Championships from 1989 till 1995.

== Rule details ==
The sequence of moves implied by the rule follows.

- The tentative Black plays the first move in the center of the board.
- The tentative White plays the second move in the center 3x3 square.
- The tentative Black plays the third move in the center 5x5 square thus deciding which opening pattern out of 24 patterns possible will be used. (Two of the 26 theoretically possible patterns are forbidden.)
- The tentative White decides which of the players that will play as Black and as White in the game (White has the right to swap sides).
- The now decided player being White makes the 4th move in an optional unoccupied intersection.
- Black (the player with the black stones) has to make two different proposals for 5th stone. The proposals have to be unequal in all respects. White has the right to choose one of the two proposals from Black to become the 5th move of the game. The time for Black goes till he has given two correct proposals. For White the time goes till he has accepted one of the proposals and till he has made the 6th move which can be made in any unoccupied intersection.
- With the 5th move the special opening rules for the moves are ended.

It is not allowed to pass within the opening stage until the sixth stone appears on the board.

== Brief description ==
This rule made diagonal openings dominating and therefore was substituted by RIF opening rule in 1996. The only difference between these two rules is who makes the second move. This rule grants this possibility to the second player (tentative white) and RIF rule grants all of the first three moves to the first player (tentative black).

== Tournaments played by this rule ==
This opening rule is official opening rule for Renju World Championships until 1995.
