= RIF opening rule =

RIF opening rule is a renju opening rule. It was adopted by the Renju International Federation (RIF) in 1996 as an upgrade to Swap opening rule and was an official rule for Renju World Championships from 1996 till 2008.

== Rule details ==
The sequence of moves implied by the rule follows.

- The tentative Black plays all the first three moves (two moves for black and one move for white i.e. he decides which of the 26 patterns that will be used).
- The tentative White decides which of the players that will play as Black and as White in the game (White has the right to swap sides).
- The now decided player being White makes the 4th move in an optional unoccupied intersection.
- Black (the player with the black stones) has to make two different proposals for 5th stone. The proposals have to be unequal in all respects. White has the right to choose one of the two proposals from Black to become the 5th move of the game. The time for Black goes till he has given two correct proposals. For White the time goes till he has accepted one of the proposals and till he has made the 6th move which can be made in any unoccupied intersection.
- With the 5th move the special opening rules for the moves are ended.

It is not allowed to pass within the first three moves.

== Brief description ==
This rule offers a very limited variety of equal openings for top-players (namely, 3D, 11D). After some years of playing and analyzing (taking into account the growth of computer capabilities) it became clear that this opening rule needs to be upgraded. Therefore, in 2008 the Yamaguchi opening rule was adopted as an opening rule for official title tournaments and some other rules were certified by RIF.

== Tournaments played by this rule ==
This opening rule was an official opening rule for Renju World Championships and Renju Team World Championships as well as the most of other tournaments between 1996 and 2007. Now it is used mostly in novice-level tournaments.
