= Yang Yanxi =

Chinese Renju player

Yang Yanxi (Chinese: 杨彦希, born March 3, 1982) is a Chinese Renju player. Yang was born in Harbin, Heilongjiang, and is living in Hebei province. In May 2012, as a member of the 2nd Chinese Team, he got the third place in the 9th Team World Championship in Renju. In November 2015, he won the second place in Men's Renju League of the 3rd Chinese National Mind Sport Tournament. In October 2017, he won the 11th Chinese National Renju Championship. In May 2018, as a member of the Chinese team, he won the 12th Team World Championship in Renju.
