= Pegity =

Board game

Peg'ity
- Box cover from a vintage copy from the 1920s
- Publishers: Parker Brothers
- Publication: 1925; 101 years ago
- Players: 2-4
- Playing time: 20 minutes
- Age range: 12+

Pegity (originally titled Peg'ity) is a strategic board game originally published by Parker Brothers in 1925 that is similar to Gomoku.

== Description ==
Peg'ity, an abstract strategy game in which players attempt to create a line of markers, is a predecessor of the more recent game Connect 4.

=== Components ===
- a pegboard, usually 16 holes x 16 holes
- four sets of colored pegs

=== Gameplay ===
To begin play, the first player places one of their colored pegs in any hole in the pegboard. Play passes to each player in turn, one peg being placed per turn. Each player attempts to place five of their pegs in a straight line in adjacent holes either horizontally, vertically or diagonally. At the same time, players try to prevent other players from achieving the same threshold by placing one of their own pegs at one end of an opponent's line of pegs while it still has only three pegs or fewer. Then if the player with three in a row places a fourth, any player can completely block five in a row by placing their peg at the other end of the four.

The game also includes patterns for creating designs on the game board as an alternative to playing the game for children too young to play the game.

== Publication history ==
Parker Brothers introduced the game in 1925, and continued to produce it through the 1960s.

== Recognition ==
Copies of Peg'ity are held in the collections of several museums:

- The Canadian Museum of History
- The Strong National Museum of Play (object ID 114.33930).
- The V&A Museum of Childhood
- The National Trust (held at Calke Abbey Museum, Derbyshire, object NT 287349)

== Scholarship ==
In the paper Adversary Problem Solving by Humans, Dennis H. Holding examines several studies that have used Peg'ity to study memory encoding as it relates to developing effective strategies in adversarial board games.

In the August 1971 edition of Scientific American, Martin Gardner examines the mathematics and strategies of gomuku, "sold in the U.S. by Parker Brothers under the name Pegity."
