= Kazuto Hasegawa =

Japanese renju player

Kazuto Hasegawa (長谷川 一人, Hasegawa Kazuto; February 12, 1963) is a Japanese renju player. He won Renju World Champion in 1997. Up to 2009, Hasegawa has been the Japan's Meijin title holder for 6 years.
