= Wu Di (renju player) =

Chinese renju player

Wu Di (吴镝, born April 23, 1979, in Fushun, Liaoning Province) is a Chinese renju player. He won the Renju World Championship in 2007, becoming the first Renju world champion from China. In 2008, he achieved third place in Renju Team World Championship playing on the second table of Chinese team.
