= Gomocup =

Gomoku and Renju tournament for AIs

Gomocup is a worldwide tournament of artificial intelligences (AI) playing Gomoku and Renju. The tournament has been played since 2000 and takes place every year. As of 2016, it is the most famous and largest Gomoku AI tournament in the world, with around 40 participants from about 10 countries.

== Rules ==
Gomocup has been played in the freestyle Gomoku rule with the board size of 20 since it was started in 2000. In 2009, the standard Gomoku rule was added into Gomocup as a tournament, in which the board size is 15 and more than five in a row is not considered to be a win. In 2016, the Renju rule was also added into Gomocup, with a board size of 15 and forbidden moves for black. In particular, since there are a large number of participants in the freestyle Gomoku tournament, the freestyle Gomoku tournament is divided into several leagues, and the fast game tournament is introduced.

To get rid of the fact that there is a winning strategy for the player who plays first in Gomoku, balanced openings have been prepared by Gomoku experts since 2006. Games would be started from these balanced openings, and neither side would have a big advantage from the very beginning.

== AI vs. Human Tournament ==
There were two AI vs. Human tournaments held in the Czech Republic in 2006 and 2011.

In 2006, the top 3 programs in Gomocup had a tournament with 3 of the top 10 players in Piškvorky online. There were 2 games between each pair of AI and human players. The result was one win, one draw and one loss for AIs, and the total score was 3:3.

In 2011, the tournament was between the top 4 programs in Gomocup and 4 players at the top of the Czech Gomoku rating list. Similar to the 1st tournament, there were 2 games between each pair of AI. This time there were 3 draws and 1 win for AIs, and the total score was 5:3.

== Elo Rating ==
The Elo rating system for Gomocup was built in 2016 and calculated with all the historical tournament results ever since. The rating is calculated with the open-source tool BayesElo, with a few parameters modified to get adapted to the Gomoku game. There is a rating list for each game rule. The Elo ratings are updated every year after the Gomocup tournament finishes.

Elo Ratings for Freestyle Gomoku
Rank	AI	Author	Country	Elo Rating
1	Yixin	Sun Kai	China	2409
2	Goro	Victor Barykin	Russia	1981
3	RenjuSolver	Wen Xiangdong	China	1951
4	SlowRenju	Hao Tianyi	China	1937
4	Tito	Andrej Tokarjev	Hungary	1928
6	Hewer	Tomas Kubes	Czech Republic	1887
7	Swine	Jiri Fontan	Czech Republic	1843
8	Onix	Istvan Virag; Janos Wagner	Hungary	1843
9	Carbon	Michal Czardybon	Poland	1810
10	HGarden	Han Bingqing	China	1739
11	Wine	Wang Jinjie	China	1696
12	Embryo	Mira Fontan	Czech Republic	1647
13	Pela	Petr Lastovicka	Czech Republic	1632
14	Whose	Hou Wen	Czech Republic	1608
15	GMotor	Roman Vancura	Czech Republic	1555
16	HFM	Csaba Jergler	Hungary	1549
17	Kanec	Jaroslav Babak	Czech Republic	1509
18	Chis	Zheng Peiming	China	1472
19	Zetor	Tomas Chmela	Czech Republic	1455
20	XoXo	Jakub Horak	Czech Republic	1442
21	HighFive	Peter Karpov	Russia	1429
22	Beta	Tomas Kubes	Czech Republic	1362
23	Bestmove	Wen Xiangdong	China	1292
24	Eulring	Bian Junyi	China	1286
25	Amoeba	Galli Zoltan	Hungary	1283
26	Pecuchet	Vilem Walter	Czech Republic	1204
27	Jude	Li Tian	China	1200
28	Sparkle	Lee Jaechan	South Korea	1172
29	Ignitor	Lee Jaechan	South Korea	1100
30	QMentat	Vojta Havranek	Czech Republic	1083
31	Krysa	Jiri Fontan	Czech Republic	1080
32	Noesis	Mark Mammel	United States	1065
33	Nabamoku	Jiri Isa	Czech Republic	1011
34	Trunkat	Jiri Trunkat	Czech Republic	1000
35	PureGM	Paul Dwyer	Japan	993
36	Imro	Imrich Kovac	Slovakia	972
37	Puskvorec	Patrik Bezdicek	Czech Republic	969
38	FastGomoku	Wang Zheng	China	932
39	Pisq	Martin Petricek	Czech Republic	897
40	Djall	Ladislav Petr	Czech Republic	969
41	Licht	Li Xinhui	China	814
42	Brutefor	Vasek Synacek	Czech Republic	811
43	Stahlfaust	Marco Kunze; Sebastian Nowozin	Germany	806
44	Valkyrie	Takashi Kokubun	Japan	792
45	Leonardo	Milan Matlak	Czech Republic	792
46	Benjamin	Benjamin Vejnar	Czech Republic	789
47	FiveRow	Yaroslav	Ukraine	782
48	AI	Jan Macura	Czech Republic	754
49	DeepBlue	Vojta Havranek	Czech Republic	742
50	PureRocky	Paul Dwyer	Japan	740
51	Crusher	Nils Beckmann	Germany	672
52	Curnpis	Jan Curn	Czech Republic	662
53	Prolog	David Macek	Czech Republic	623
54	Mushroom	Chen Kai	China	383

Elo Ratings for Standard Gomoku
Rank	AI	Author	Country	Elo Rating
1	Yixin	Sun Kai	China	2409
2	RenjuSolver	Wen Xiangdong	China	1978
3	SlowRenju	Hao Tianyi	China	1958
4	Tito	Andrej Tokarjev	Hungary	1944
5	Hewer	Tomas Kubes	Czech Republic	1928
6	Whose	Hou Wen	China	1665
7	Carbon	Michal Czardybon	Poland	1624
8	GMotor	Roman Vancura	Czech Republic	1595
9	Pela	Petr Lastovicka	Czech Republic	1572
10	Zetor	Tomas Chmela	Czech Republic	1507

Elo Ratings for Fastgame Gomoku
Rank	AI	Author	Country	Elo Rating
1	Yixin	Sun Kai	China	2297
2	Goro	Victor Barykin	Russia	2073
3	Hewer	Tomas Kubes	Czech Republic	1930
4	SlowRenju	Hao Tianyi	China	1863
5	Tito	Andrej Tokarjev	Hungary	1855
6	Swine	Jiri Fontan	Czech Republic	1789
7	Carbon	Michal Czardybon	Poland	1780
8	HGarden	Han Bingqing	China	1705
9	Wine	Wang Jinjie	China	1695
10	Pela	Petr Lastovicka	Czech Republic	1663
11	Embryo	Mira Fontan	Czech Republic	1658
12	Whose	Hou Wen	China	1630
13	GMotor	Roman Vancura	Czech Republic	1606
14	Chis	Zheng Peiming	China	1598
15	HFM	Csaba Jergler	Hungary	1545
16	XoXo	Jakub Horak	Czech Republic	1505
17	HighFive	Peter Karpov	Russia	1480
18	Kanec	Jaroslav Babak	Czech Republic	1466
19	Zetor	Tomas Chmela	Czech Republic	1456
20	Amoeba	Galli Zoltan	Hungary	1325
21	Eulring	Bian Junyi	China	1310
22	Licht	Li Xinhui	China	1283
23	Pecuchet	Vilem Walter	Czech Republic	1230
24	Jude	Li Tian	China	1219
25	Sparkle	Lee Jaechan	South Korea	1219
26	Ignitor	Lee Jaechan	South Korea	1139
27	QMentat	Vojta Havranek	Czech Republic	1086
28	Noesis	Mark Mammel	United States	1061
29	Trunkat	Jiri Trunkat	Czech Republic	1060
30	Imro	Imrich Kovac	Slovakia	1019
31	Puskvorec	Patrik Bezdicek	Czech Republic	1011
32	Nabamoku	Jiri Isa	Czech Republic	1000
33	PureGM	Paul Dwyer	Japan	965
34	FastGomoku	Wang Zheng	China	957
35	Pisq	Martin Petricek	Czech Republic	938
36	Djall	Ladislav Petr	Czech Republic	904
37	Leonardo	Milan Matlak	Czech Republic	891
38	Benjamin	Benjamin Vejnar	Czech Republic	862
39	AI	Jan Macura	Czech Republic	837
40	Valkyrie	Takashi Kokubun	Japan	822
41	Stahlfaust	Marco Kunze; Sebastian Nowozin	Germany	807
42	FiveRow	Yaroslav	Ukraine	773
43	Curnpis	Jan Curn	Czech Republic	728
44	PureRocky	Paul Dwyer	Japan	727
45	Crusher	Nils Beckmann	Germany	669
46	Prolog	David Macek	Czech Republic	610
47	Mushroom	Chen Kai	China	416

Elo Ratings for Renju
Rank	AI	Author	Country	Elo Rating
1	Yixin	Sun Kai	China	2725
2	RenjuSolver	Wen Xiangdong	China	2334
3	SlowRenju	Hao Tianyi	China	2316
4	Carbon	Michal Czardybon	Poland	2155
5	XL	Chen Chengtao	China	1982
6	Pela	Petr Lastovicka	Czech Republic	1970
7	Whose	Hou Wen	China	1927

== Results ==
The results for the Gomocup tournaments since 2000 is in the following.

Results of Gomocup Freestyle Gomoku League (2000 - 2017) (Note: One author is only allowed to submit one AI to each tournament since 2005.)
Year	1st			2nd			3rd			Balanced Opening
Year	AI	Author	Country	AI	Author	Country	AI	Author	Country	Balanced Opening
2000	Pisq 5	Martin Petricek	Czech Republic	Pisq 4	Martin Petricek	Czech Republic	Pisq 3	Martin Petricek	Czech Republic	Not used
2001	Pisq 5	Martin Petricek	Czech Republic	Mentat	Vojta Havranek	Czech Republic	Leonardo	Milan Matlak	Czech Republic	Not used
2002	Trunkat	Jiri Trunkat	Czech Republic	Krysa	Jiri Fontan	Czech Republic	XMentat	Vojta Havranek	Czech Republic	Not used
2003	Svine	Jiri Fontan	Czech Republic	Hewer	Tomas Kubes	Czech Republic	Trunkat	Jiri Trunkat	Czech Republic	Not used
2004	Svine	Jiri Fontan	Czech Republic	Goro	Victor Barykin	Russia	Bestmove	Wen Xiangdong	China	Not used
2005	Goro	Victor Barykin	Russia	Swine	Jiri Fontan	Czech Republic	Pela	Petr Lastovicka	Czech Republic	Not used
2006	Goro	Victor Barykin	Russia	Tito	Andrej Tokarjev	Hungary	HGarden	Han Bingqing	China	Used
2007	Tito	Andrej Tokarjev	Hungary	HGarden	Han Bingqing	China	Swine	Jiri Fontan	Czech Republic	Used
2008	Tito	Andrej Tokarjev	Hungary	Onix	Istvan Virag; Janos Wagner	Hungary	HGarden	Han Bingqing	China	Used
2009	Goro	Victor Barykin	Russia	Onix	Istvan Virag; Janos Wagner	Hungary	HGarden	Han Bingqing	China	Used
2010	Goro	Victor Barykin	Russia	Tito	Andrej Tokarjev	Hungary	Onix	Istvan Virag; Janos Wagner	Hungary	Used
2011	Tito	Andrej Tokarjev	Hungary	RenjuSolver	Wen Xiangdong	China	Swine	Jiri Fontan	Czech Republic	Used
2012	Yixin	Sun Kai	China	RenjuSolver	Wen Xiangdong	China	Hewer	Tomas Kubes	Czech Republic	Used
2013	Yixin	Sun Kai	China	Tito	Andrej Tokarjev	Hungary	RenjuSolver	Wen Xiangdong	China	Used
2014	Yixin	Sun Kai	China	RenjuSolver	Wen Xiangdong	China	Hewer	Tomas Kubes	Czech Republic	Used
2015	Yixin	Sun Kai	China	RenjuSolver	Wen Xiangdong	China	Tito	Andrej Tokarjev	Hungary	Used
2016	Yixin	Sun Kai	China	RenjuSolver	Wen Xiangdong	China	SlowRenju	Hao Tianyi	China	Used
2017	Yixin	Sun Kai	China	RenjuSolver	Wen Xiangdong	China	Goro	Victor Barykin	Russia	Used
2018	Yixin	Sun Kai	China	RenjuSolver	Wen Xiangdong	China	Goro	Victor Barykin	Russia	Used

Results of Gomocup Fastgame (Freestyle Gomoku) League (2005 - 2017)
Year	1st			2nd			3rd			Balanced Opening
Year	AI	Author	Country	AI	Author	Country	AI	Author	Country	Balanced Opening
2005	Pela	Petr Lastovicka	Czech Republic	Goro	Victor Barykin	Russia	Beta	Tomas Kubes	Czech Republic	Not used
2006	Pela	Petr Lastovicka	Czech Republic	Tito	Andrej Tokarjev	Hungary	Goro	Victor Barykin	Russia	Used
2007	Tito	Andrej Tokarjev	Hungary	HGarden	Han Bingqing	China	Pela	Petr Lastovicka	Czech Republic	Used
2008	Tito	Andrej Tokarjev	Hungary	HGarden	Han Bingqing	China	Hewer	Tomas Kubes	Czech Republic	Used
2009	Hewer	Tomas Kubes	Czech Republic	HGarden	Han Bingqing	China	Kanec	Jaroslav Babak	Czech Republic	Used
2010	Goro	Victor Barykin	Russia	Hewer	Tomas Kubes	Czech Republic	Tito	Andrej Tokarjev	Hungary	Used
2011	Swine	Jiri Fontan	Czech Republic	Tito	Andrej Tokarjev	Hungary	RenjuSolver	Wen Xiangdong	China	Used
2012	Hewer	Tomas Kubes	Czech Republic	Yixin	Sun Kai	China	Swine	Jiri Fontan	Czech Republic	Used
2013	Yixin	Sun Kai	China	Hewer	Tomas Kubes	Czech Republic	HGarden	Han Bingqing	China	Used
2014	Yixin	Sun Kai	China	Goro	Victor Barykin	Russia	Hewer	Tomas Kubes	Czech Republic	Used
2015	Yixin	Sun Kai	China	Goro	Victor Barykin	Russia	Hewer	Tomas Kubes	Czech Republic	Used
2016	Yixin	Sun Kai	China	Goro	Victor Barykin	Russia	SlowRenju	Hao Tianyi	China	Used
2017	Yixin	Sun Kai	China	Goro	Victor Barykin	Russia	Hewer	Tomas Kubes	Czech Republic	Used

Results of Gomocup Standard Gomoku League (2009 - 2017) (Note: The result of standard Gomoku is not accurate due to technical problems in 2009 and 2010.)
Year	1st			2nd			3rd			Balanced Opening
Year	AI	Author	Country	AI	Author	Country	AI	Author	Country	Balanced Opening
2009	Hewer	Tomas Kubes	Czech Republic	Pela	Petr Lastovicka	Czech Republic	-			Used
2010	Hewer	Tomas Kubes	Czech Republic	Tito	Andrej Tokarjev	Hungary	Pela	Petr Lastovicka	Czech Republic	Used
2011	Tito	Andrej Tokarjev	Hungary	Hewer	Tomas Kubes	Czech Republic	GMotor	Roman Vancura	Czech Republic	Used
2012	Hewer	Tomas Kubes	Czech Republic	Tito	Andrej Tokarjev	Hungary	Yixin	Sun Kai	China	Used
2013	Yixin	Sun Kai	China	Tito	Andrej Tokarjev	Hungary	Hewer	Tomas Kubes	Czech Republic	Used
2014	Tito	Andrej Tokarjev	Hungary	Yixin	Sun Kai	China	Hewer	Tomas Kubes	Czech Republic	Used
2015	Yixin	Sun Kai	China	Tito	Andrej Tokarjev	Hungary	Hewer	Tomas Kubes	Czech Republic	Used
2016	Yixin	Sun Kai	China	RenjuSolver	Wen Xiangdong	China	Tito	Andrej Tokarjev	Hungary	Used
2017	Yixin	Sun Kai	China	RenjuSolver	Wen Xiangdong	China	SlowRenju	Hao Tianyi	China	Used

Results of Gomocup Renju League (2016 - 2017)
Year	1st			2nd			3rd			Balanced Opening
Year	AI	Author	Country	AI	Author	Country	AI	Author	Country	Balanced Opening
2016	Yixin	Sun Kai	China	RenjuSolver	Wen Xiangdong	China	SlowRenju	Hao Tianyi	China	Used
2017	Yixin	Sun Kai	China	RenjuSolver	Wen Xiangdong	China	SlowRenju	Hao Tianyi	China	Used
