= Connect6 =

Abstract strategy board game

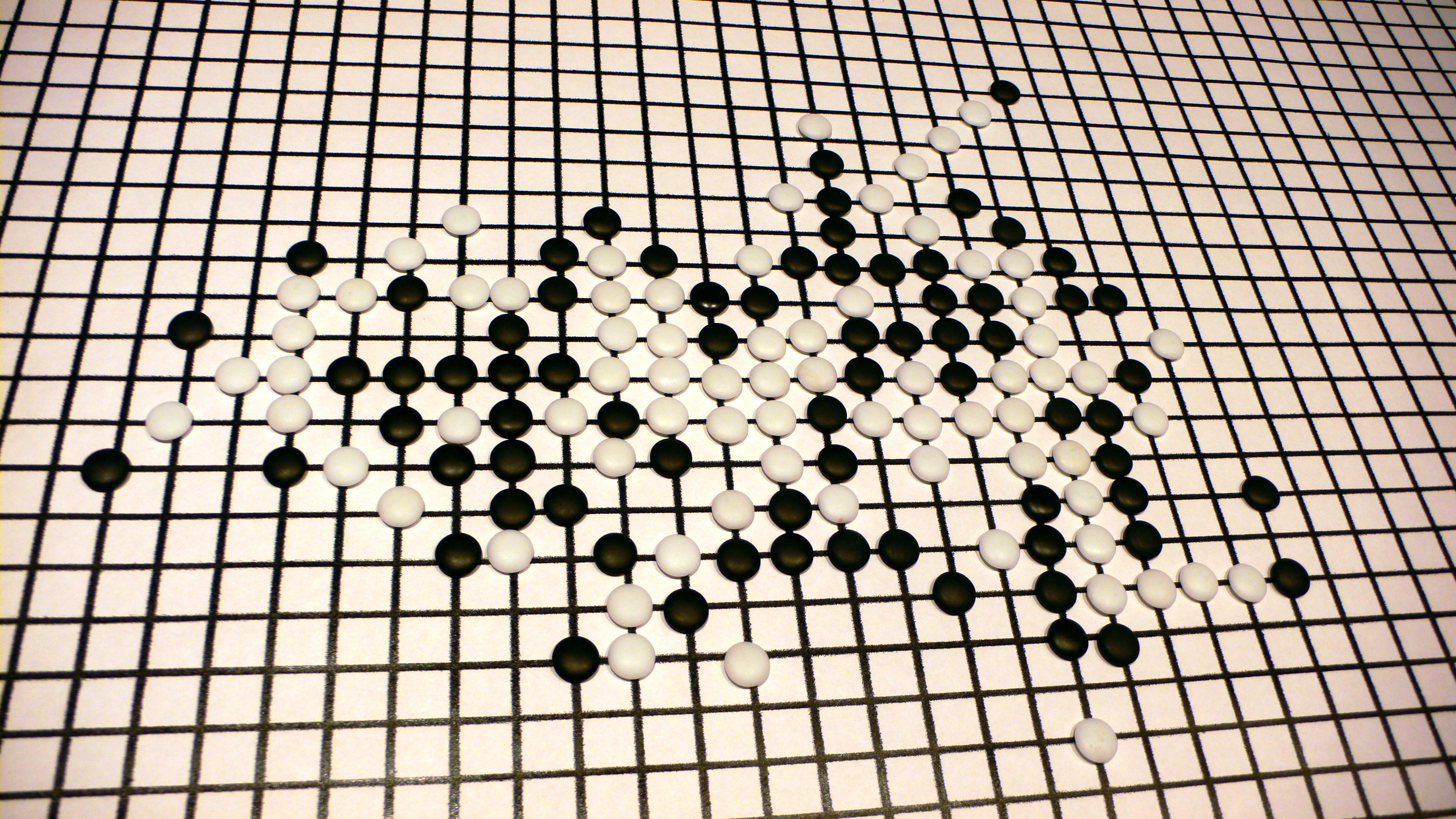
- A game of Connect6
- Players: 2
- Setup time: No setup needed
- Playing time: 10–60 min.
- Chance: None
- Skills: Strategy, Observation

Connect6 (Chinese: 六子棋; Pinyin: liùzǐqí; Chinese: 連六棋;Japanese: 六目並べ; Korean: 육목) introduced in 2003 by Professor I-Chen Wu at Department of Computer Science and Information Engineering, National Chiao Tung University in Taiwan, is a two-player strategy game similar to Gomoku.

Two players, Black and White, alternately place two stones of their own colour, black and white respectively, on empty intersections of a Go-like board, except that Black (the first player) places one stone only for the first move. The one who gets six or more stones in a row (horizontally, vertically or diagonally) first wins the game.

== Rules ==
The rules of Connect6 are very simple and similar to the traditional game of Gomoku:

- Players and stones: There are two players. Black plays first, and White second. Each player plays with an appropriate color of stones, as in Go and Gomoku.
- Game board: Connect6 is played on a square board made up of orthogonal lines, with each intersection capable of holding one stone. In theory, the game board can be any finite size from 1×1 up (integers only), or it could be of infinite size. However, boards that are too small may lack strategy (boards smaller than 6×6 are automatic draws), and extremely large or infinite boards are of little practical use. 19×19 Go boards might be the most convenient. For a longer and more challenging game, another suggested size is 59×59, or nine Go boards tiled in a larger square (using the join lines between the boards as additional grid lines).
- Game moves: Black plays first, putting one black stone on one intersection. Subsequently, White and Black take turns, placing two stones on two different unoccupied spaces each turn.
- Winner: The player who is the first to get six or more stones in a row (horizontally, vertically, or diagonally) wins. (This is a departure from Gomoku, where it must be exactly five in a row.)

According to Professor Wu, the handicap of black's only being able to play one stone on the first turn means that the game is comparatively fair; unlike similar games such as Gomoku and Connect Four, which have been proven to give the first player a large advantage, possibly no additional compensation is necessary to make the game fair.

== Fairness ==
In principle, even some complex games are not fair: either the first or second player has an advantage. (Games such as Gomoku have been mathematically proven to give an advantage to one player or another; complex games such as chess are generally not able to be fully analyzed.) Herik, Uiterwijk, and Rijswijck give an informal definition of fairness (Herik, Uiterwijk, and Rijswijck, 2002) as follows: A game is considered a fair game if it is a draw and both players have roughly equal opportunities for making mistakes. From this, it is argued that Connect6 is fair in the following senses:

- Each player always has one more stone than the other after making each move.
- For about one thousand opening templates, Professor Wu let the AI program written by his team play against itself, and the result seemed to show that the game does not favor either one for these templates. The AI program can beat most casual players, but this does not necessarily imply that its strategy is strictly optimal.
- The initial breakaway (where White plays far away from the initial black stone) is a guaranteed loss for White, according to Professor Wu. The principle is that Black can essentially ignore White's move, giving Black a three-stone lead that is insurmountable.

However, this evidence is not conclusive.

== Complexity ==
If Connect6 uses an infinite board, both state-space and game-tree complexities are infinite as well. Instead, assume that a Go board is used. The game-tree complexities for it are still much higher than those in Gomoku and Renju, since many more moves are possible placing two stones than one—specifically n(n−1)/2 moves are possible, where n is the number of unoccupied spaces before a move. However, the state-space complexity is largely unchanged, since any legal position in one game will also be legal in the other. Based on the standard in Herik, Huntjens, and Rijswijck, the state-space complexity of Connect(19,19,6,2,1) is 10^{172}, about the same as that in Go or Gomoku. If a larger board is used, the complexity is much higher, since the number of moves increases exponentially with board size; it should still be the same as the other two games on the same size board.

Now, let us investigate the game tree complexity. Assume that the averaged game length is still 30, the same as the estimation for Gomoku (Allis 1994). Then, the number of grids chosen to put one stone is about 300, and the number of choices of one move is about $\left(\frac{300\times300}{2}\right)$ or 45,000. Thus, the game-tree complexity is about $\left(\frac{300\times 300}{2}\right)^{30}$ ≈ 10^{140}, much higher than that for Gomoku. Alternatively, if one assumes that the total number of stones placed (instead of the number of moves) is the same as that for Gomoku, that leaves us with an average game length of roughly 15. Then the game-tree complexity is roughly $\left(\frac{300\times300}{2}\right)^{15}$ ≈ 10^{70}, the same order of magnitude as that for Gomoku given in Allis 1994. Again, if a larger board is used, this complexity becomes much higher.

== History ==
The main stream of the current Connect6 development started from the presentation by Professor I-Chen Wu. Since the game rules are simple, it is believed that several have thought of the rules earlier. For example, one claims: the idea of the game (Chinese name "六子棋") emerged on the internet around 1999 first on the Chinese popular BBS site bbs.tsinghua.edu.cn and subsequently on the popular overseas Chinese BBS site bbs.mit.edu (now www.mitbbs.com). However, no Connect6 game records existed or were discussed before Prof. Wu introduced the game Connect6. The history from Prof. Wu is as follows.

One day in the summer of 2003, Prof. Wu came up with this game when playing with his daughter. He started considering the potential of the game to be popular, and began to investigate it. To be popular, he reasoned, his game must be fair and complex, so his first plan was to have a computer program play the game to see how fair and complex it is.

In spring 2004, a master student of Prof. Wu, Dei-Yen Huang, joined Wu's project as his master thesis. In the first quarter of 2005, they completed the first Connect6 AI program, which already can beat most players. Then Wu's team allowed his AI program to play itself.

In 2005, Wu's team wrote a paper, presented in the 11th Advances in Computer Games Conference (ACG11), held in Taipei, Taiwan, 2005.

In September 2005, ThinkNewIdea Limited built the first Connect6 game server.

On September 20–September 21, 2005, the game was covered by many news media in Taiwan.

The program NCTU6, rewritten by Professor Wu, won gold in the Connect6 tournament at the 11th Computer Olympiad.

== See also ==
- Chess
- Game complexity
- Go equipment
- List of Taiwanese inventions and discoveries
- Pente
- Renju
- Teeko
