= Qi Guan =

Chinese Renju player

Qi Guan (Chinese: 祁观, born 4 November 1985) is a Chinese Renju player. He won the Renju World Championship in 2015. Up to 2018, Qi Guan has won the Chinese National Renju Championship for 2 times and the Chinese National Team Renju Championship for one time.
