= Vladimir Sushkov =

Russian Renju player (born 1978)

Vladimir Sushkov (Russian: Владимир Сушков; born December 1, 1978) is a Russian Renju player. He won the Renju World Championships in 2009 and 2017, and the Renju Team World Championship in 2000, 2004 and 2006. Up to 2009, Vladimir Sushkov has won the Russian Renju Championship for 3 times.
