= Ants Soosõrv =

Estonian Renju player

Ants Soosõrv (born March 15, 1969, in Tallinn) is an Estonian renju player and coach. As a member of the Estonian team, he won the Team World Renju Championships for two times in 2008 and 2014. Since 2005, Ants Soosõrv had become the general secretary of the Renju International Federation, until he retired in 2022.

== Biography ==
Ants Soosõrv began to play renju in 1987. In the European Renju Championship, he has won one gold medal (2014), two silver medals (2000 and 2012) and two bronze medals (1998, 2006). Ants has taken part in the final stage of the World Renju Championships for five times, getting the 6th place (1993), 10th place (1995), 5th place (1997), 5th place (1999) and the 7th place (2001) separately. As a member of the Estonian team, he has won two gold medals (2008, 2014) and five silver medals (1996, 2002, 2004, 2006, 2010) in the Team World Renju Championships. He was the chief editor of the Renju World magazine from 1999 to 2009.
