= Yamaguchi opening rule =

Yamaguchi opening rule is a renju opening rule. It was developed by Japanese player Yusui Yamaguchi.

== Rule details ==
The sequence of moves implied by the rule follows.

- The first player (tentative black) puts one of the 26 openings and declares how many 5th moves will be offered in that game.
- The next player (tentative white) has a right to swap.
- The white player puts the 4th move anywhere on the board.
- The black player puts as many 5th moves on the board as it was declared before (symmetrical moves not allowed).
- The white player chooses one 5th from these offerings and plays the 6th move.

== Brief description ==
This rule is very close to an old RIF opening rule and therefore favorited. It gives an average variety of new playable variants in a good number of openings, but some of them (13ths and some others) don't become playable. More, this opening rule doesn't protect players from a 11D-draw variants.

== Tournaments played by this rule ==
This opening rule was official opening rule for Renju World Championships and Renju Team World Championships from 2009 to 2015.
