= Ando Meritee =

Estonian Renju player

Ando Meritee (born July 30, 1974) is an Estonian Renju player currently residing in Estonia. He was Renju World Champion in 1993, 1999, 2001, 2005, and won the Team World Championship in 2014. He has also won European Renju Championship 3 times, in 1996, 1998, 2006. In 1999 Ando Meritee played a "match of two titans" against the Japanese legend Shigeru Nakamura, winning the match 3,5-2,5.
