= Shigeru Nakamura (renju player) =

Japanese Renju player

Shigeru Nakamura (中村 茂, Nakamura Shigeru; August 22, 1959) is a Japanese renju player. He won Renju World Championships in 1989 and 1991, and Renju Team World Championships in 2012. Up to 2020, he has been the Japan's Meijin title holder for 30 years. In 2019, Nakamura was awarded the 7th Lifetime Meijin title by the Japanese Renju Federation. Up to 2021, Nakamura has won the All Japan Renju Championship 8 times, and the Kanto Renju Emperor Tournament 14 times. In 1999, Nakamura played a "match of two titans" against the Estonian world champion Ando Meritee. The match ended in a victory for Meritee with the score 3.5 - 2.5.
