= Norihiko Kawamura =

Japanese Renju player

Norihiko Kawamura (河村 典彦, Kawamura Norihiko; October 14, 1964) is a Japanese Renju player. He won Renju World Champion in 1995. Up to 2004, Kawamura has been Japan's Meijin title holder for 3 years.
