= Wang Qingqing (renju player) =

Chinese Renju player

Wang Qingqing (Chinese: 汪清清, born August 21, 1991) is a Chinese champion Renju player.

== Early life ==
On August 21, 1991, Wang was born in Huoqiu, Anhui, China.

== Career ==
In 2009, Wang won the champion in the Women's Renju League of the 1st Chinese National Mind Sport Tournament, and then won the 4th Chinese National Mind Sport Games in 2019. By 2021, she has won the Women's League of the Chinese National Renju Championship for 6 times. In 2014, she won the Men's League of the Chinese National Open Tournament, becoming the first female player who has ever won in a men's league of an official national Renju tournament in China. In 2014, she won the Girls' U23 League of the Youth World Championship in Renju. In 2015 and 2017, she got the second place in the Women World Championship in Renju for two times.
