= Gomoku =

Abstract strategy board game

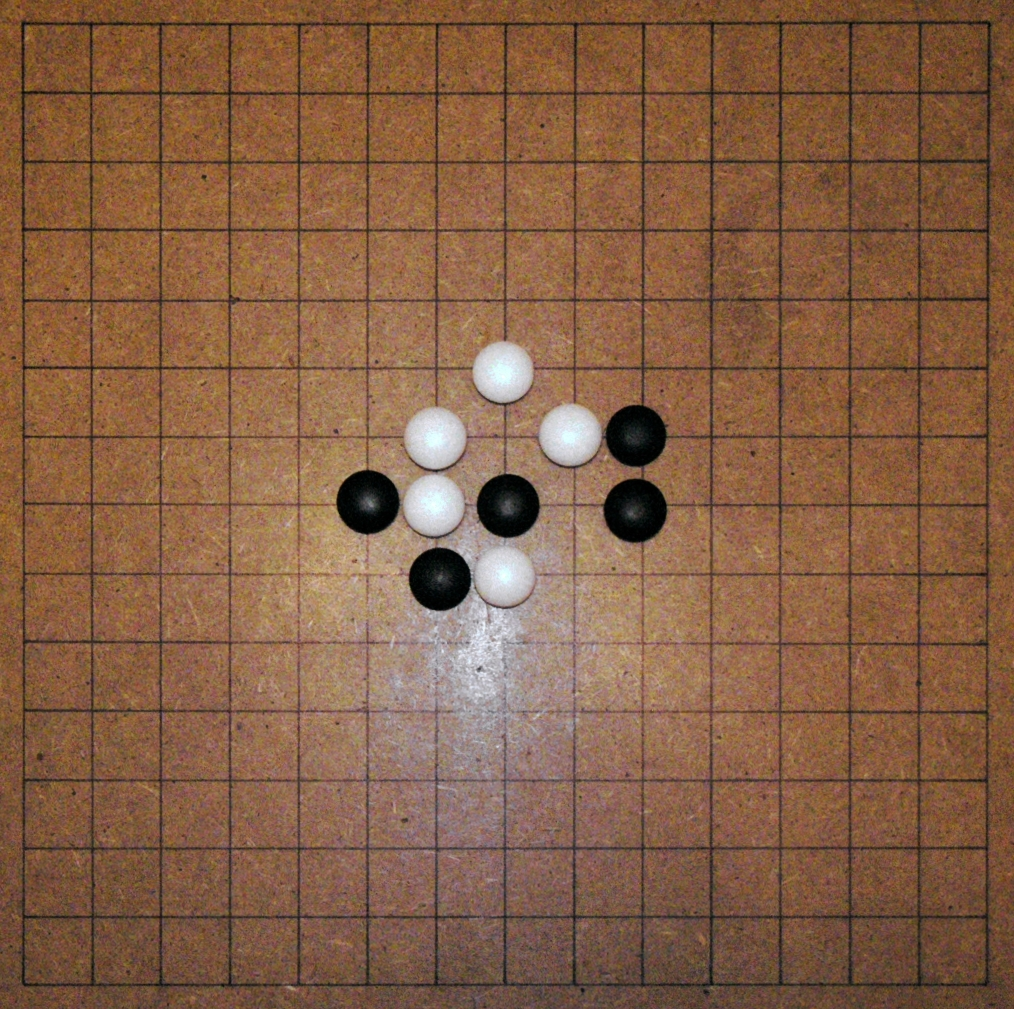
- Genres: Board game Abstract strategy game
- Players: 2
- Setup time: Minimal
- Chance: None
- Skills: Strategy, tactics

Gomoku, also called five in a row, is an abstract strategy board game. It is traditionally played with Go pieces (black and white stones) on a 15×15 Go board while in the past a 19×19 board was standard. Because pieces are typically not moved or removed from the board, gomoku may also be played as a paper-and-pencil game. The game is known in several countries under different names.

== Rules ==
Players alternate turns placing a stone of their color on an empty intersection. Black plays first. The winner is the first player to form an unbroken line of five stones of their color horizontally, vertically, or diagonally. In some rules, this line must be exactly five stones long; six or more stones in a row does not count as a win and is called an overline. If the board is completely filled and no one has made a line of 5 stones, then the game ends in a draw.

== Origin ==
Historical records indicate that the origins of gomoku can be traced back to the mid-1700s during the Edo period. It is said that the 10th generation of Kuwanaya Buemon, a merchant who frequented the Nijō family, was highly skilled in this game, which subsequently spread among the people. By the late Edo period, around 1850, books had been published on gomoku. The earliest published book on gomoku that can be verified is the Gomoku Jōseki Collection (五石定磧集) in 1856, although it might have appeared in paintings as early as Heian Jidai.

The name "gomoku" is from the Japanese language, in which it is referred to as gomokunarabe (五目並べ). Go means five, moku is a counter word for pieces and narabe means line-up. The game is popular in China, where it is called Wuziqi (五子棋). Wu (五 wǔ) means five, zi (子 zǐ) means piece, and qi (棋 qí) refers to a board game category in Chinese. The game is also popular in Korea, where it is called omok (오목 [五目]) which has the same structure and origin as the Japanese name.

In the nineteenth century, the game was introduced to Britain where it was known as Go Bang, said to be derived from the Japanese word goban, which was itself adapted from the Chinese k'i pan (qí pán) "go-board." The game gained some popularity, and in the 1920s it was produced commercially by companies such as The Chad Valley Co Ltd in a modified version marketed as Spoil Five.

== First-player advantage ==
Gomoku has a strong advantage for the first player when unrestricted.

Championships in gomoku previously used the "Pro" opening rule, which mandated that the first player place the first stone in the center of the board. The second player's stone placement was unrestricted. The first player's second stone had to be placed at least three intersections away from the first player's first stone. This rule was used in the 1989 and 1991 world championships. When the win–loss ratio of these two championships was calculated, the first player (black) won 67 percent of games.

This was deemed too unbalanced for tournament play, so tournament gomoku adopted the Swap2 opening protocol in 2009. In Swap2, the first player places three stones, two black and one white, on the board. The second player then selects one of three options: play as black, play as white and place another white stone, or place two more stones, one white and one black, and let the first player choose the color.

The win ratio of the first player has been calculated to be around 52 percent using the Swap2 opening protocol, greatly balancing the game and largely evening out the first-player advantage.

== Variants ==
=== Freestyle gomoku ===
Freestyle gomoku has no restrictions on either player and allows a player to win by creating a line of five or more stones, with each player alternating turns placing one stone at a time.

==== Swap after 1st move ====
The rule of "swap after 1st move" is a variant of the freestyle gomoku rule, and is mostly played in China. The game can be played on a 19×19 or 15×15 board. As per the rule, once the first player places a black stone on the board, the second player has the right to swap colors. The rest of the game proceeds as freestyle gomoku. This rule is set to balance the advantage of black in a simple way.

=== Renju ===
Black (the player who makes the first move) has long been known to have an advantage, even before L. Victor Allis proved that black can force a win (see below). Renju attempts to mitigate this imbalance with extra rules that aim to reduce black's first player advantage.

It is played on a 15×15 board, with the rules of three and three, four and four, and overlines applied to Black only.

- The rule of three and three bans a move that simultaneously forms two open rows of three stones (rows not blocked by an opponent's stone at either end).
- The rule of four and four bans a move that simultaneously forms two rows of four stones (open or not).
- Overlines prevent a player from winning if they form a line of 6 or more stones.

Renju also makes use of various tournament opening rules, such as Soosõrv-8, the current international standard.

=== Caro ===
In Caro, (also called gomoku+, popular among Vietnamese), the winner must have an overline or an unbroken row of five stones that is not blocked at either end (overlines are immune to this rule). This makes the game more balanced and provides more power for White to defend.

=== Omok ===
Omok is similar to Freestyle gomoku; however, it is played on a 19×19 board and includes the rule of three and three.

=== Ninuki-renju ===
Also called Wu, Ninuki Renju is a variant which adds capturing to the game; A pair of stones of the same color may be captured by the opponent by means of custodial capture (sandwiching a line of two stones lengthwise). The winner is the player either to make a perfect five in a row, or to capture five pairs of the opponent's stones. It uses a 15x15 board and the rules of three and three and overlines. It also allows the game to continue after a player has formed a row of five stones if their opponent can capture a pair across the line.

=== Pente ===
Pente is related to Ninuki-Renju, and has the same custodial capture method, but is most often played on a 19x19 board and does not use the rules of three and three, four and four, or overlines.

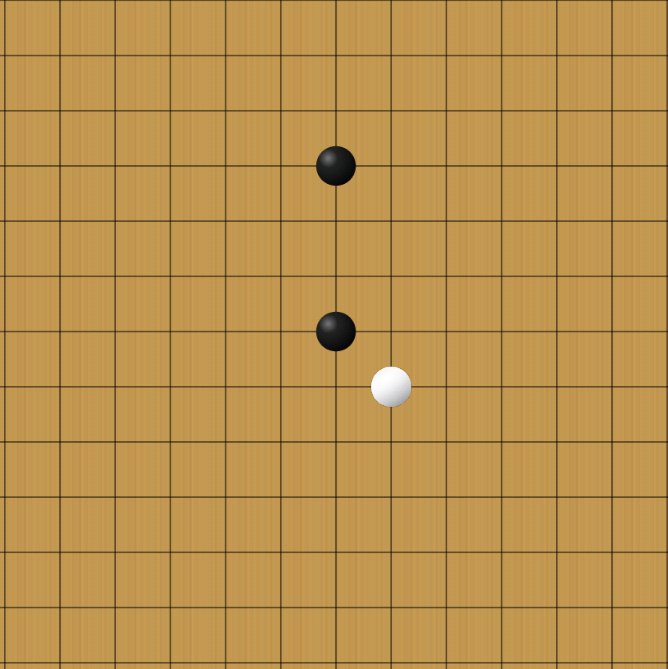
Pro Opening Rule: Black places first stone in the center of board. White can place anywhere, but places to the South-East. Black places their second stone three spaces away.

=== Tournament opening rules ===
Tournament rules are used in professional play to balance the game and mitigate the first player advantage. The tournament rule used for the gomoku world championships since 2009 is the Swap2 opening rule. For all of the following professional rules, an overline of six or more stones in a row does not count as a win.

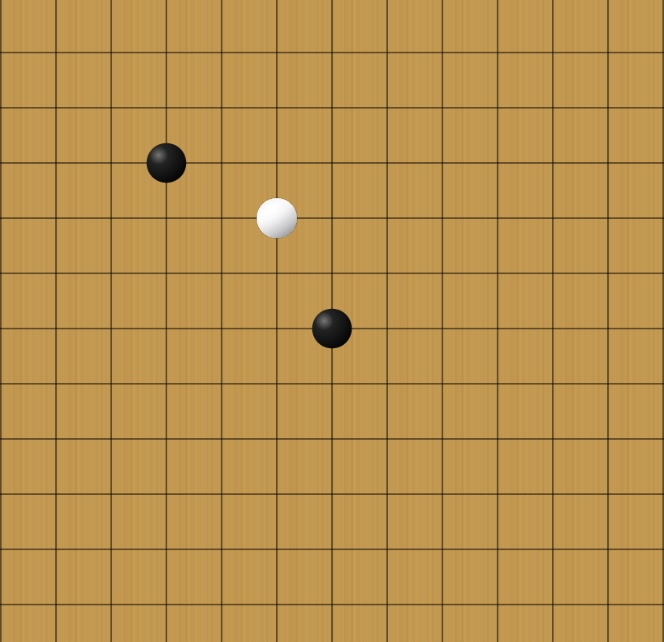
Swap Opening Rule: Tentative Black places two black stones and one white stone anywhere on the board. Tentative white chooses which color to play as.

==== Pro ====
The first player's first stone must be placed in the center of the board. The second player's first stone may be placed anywhere on the board. The first player's second stone must be placed at least three intersections away from the first stone (two empty intersections in between the two stones).

==== Long Pro ====
The first player's first stone must be placed in the center of the board. The second player's first stone may be placed anywhere on the board. The first player's second stone must be placed at least four intersections away from the first stone (three empty intersections in between the two stones).

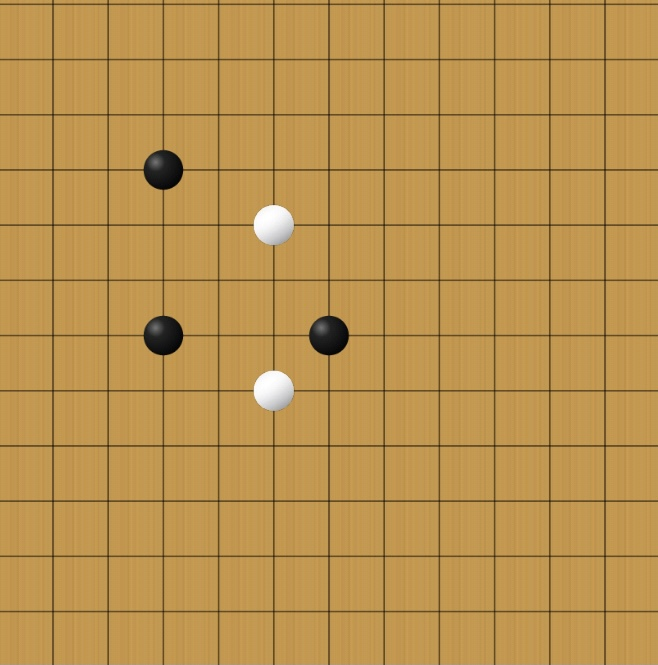
Swap2 Opening Rule: Tentative Black places two black stones and one white stone anywhere on the board. Tentative White responds by picking option number three and placing two more stones, one of each color, on the board and passes the choice of which color to play as to tentative Black.

==== Swap ====
The tentative first player places three stones (two black, and one white) anywhere on the board. The tentative second player then chooses which color to play as. Play proceeds from there as normal with white playing their second stone.

==== Swap2 ====
The tentative first player places three stones on the board, two black and one white. The tentative second player then has three options:

1. They can choose to play as white and place a second white stone
2. They can swap their color and choose to play as black
3. Or they can place two more stones, one black and one white, and pass the choice of which color to play back to the tentative first player.

Because the tentative first player does not know where the tentative second player will place the additional stones if they take option 3, the swap2 opening protocol limits excessive studying of a line by only one of the players.

== Theoretical generalizations ==
m,n,k-games are a generalization of gomoku to a board with m×n intersections, and k in a row needed to win. Connect Four is (7,6,4) with piece placement restricted to the lowest unoccupied place in a column.

Connect(m,n,k,p,q) games are another generalization of gomoku to a board with m×n intersections, k in a row needed to win, p stones for each player to place, and q stones for the first player to place for the first move only. In particular, Connect(m,n,6,2,1) is called Connect6.

== Example game ==
First game

This game on the 15×15 board is adapted from the paper "Go-Moku and Threat-Space Search".

The opening moves show clearly black's advantage. An open row of three (one that is not blocked by an opponent's stone at either end) has to be blocked immediately, or countered with a threat elsewhere on the board. If not blocked or countered, the open row of three will be extended to an open row of four, which threatens to win in two ways.

White has to block open rows of three at moves 10, 14, 16 and 20, but black only has to do so at move 9. Move 20 is a blunder for white (it should have been played next to black 19). Black can now force a win against any defense by white, starting with move 21.

Second game (continuation from first game)

There are two forcing sequences for black, depending on whether white 22 is played next to black 15 or black 21. The diagram on the right shows the first sequence. All the moves for white are forced. Such long forcing sequences are typical in gomoku, and expert players can read out forcing sequences of 20 to 40 moves rapidly and accurately.

Other second game

The diagram on the right shows the second forcing sequence. This diagram shows why white 20 was a blunder; if it had been next to black 19 (at the position of move 32 in this diagram) then black 31 would not be a threat and so the forcing sequence would fail.

== World championships ==
World Gomoku Championships were initially held twice, in 1989 and 1991. Since 2009 tournament play has resumed, with the opening rule changed to swap2.

List of the tournaments occurred and title holders follows.

World Championship
Title year	Hosting city, country	Gold	Silver	Bronze	Opening rule
1989	Kyoto, Japan	(Soviet Union) Sergey Chernov	(Soviet Union) Yuriy Tarannikov	(Japan) Hirouji Sakamoto	Pro
1991	Moscow, Soviet Union	(Soviet Union) Yuriy Tarannikov	(Soviet Union) Ando Meritee	(Soviet Union) Sergey Chernov	Pro
2009	Pardubice, Czech Republic	(Poland) Artur Tamioła	(Hungary) Attila Demján	(Czech Republic) Pavel Laube	Swap2
2011	Huskvarna, Sweden	(Hungary) Attila Demján	(Poland) Artur Tamioła	(Poland) Michał Żukowski	Swap2
2013	Tallinn, Estonia	(Hungary) Attila Demján	(Czech Republic) Pavel Laube	(Russia) Mikhail Kozhin	Swap2
2015	Suzdal, Russia	(Hungary) Rudolf Dupszki	(Hungary) Gergő Tóth	(Russia) Mikhail Kozhin	Swap2
2017	Prague, Czech Republic	(Hungary) Zoltán László	(Hungary) Rudolf Dupszki	(Russia) Denis Osipov	Swap2
2019	Tallinn, Estonia	(Czech Republic) Martin Muzika	(Ukraine) Oleg Bulatowsky	(Poland) Michał Żukowski	Swap2
2023	Budapest, Hungary	(Czech Republic) Pavel Laube	(Poland) Adrian Fitzermann	(Czech Republic) Martin Muzika	Swap2
2025	Brno, Czech Republic	(Czech Republic) Pavel Laube	(Czech Republic) Martin Muzika	(Poland) Adrian Fitzermann	Swap2

Team World Championship
Title year	Hosting city, country	Gold	Silver	Bronze	Opening rule
2016	Tallinn, Estonia	Poland; Michał Żukowski; Michał Zajk; Łukasz Majksner; Piotr Małowiejski	Czech Republic; Pavel Laube; Igor Eged; Štěpán Tesařík; Marek Hanzl	Chinese Taipei; Lu Wei-Yuan; Chen Ko-Han; Chang Yi-Feng; Sung Pei-Jung	Swap2
2018	Płock, Poland	Russia-1; Edvard Rizvanov; Denis Osipov; Ilya Muratov; Maksim Karasev; Mikhail Kozhin	Hungary; Zoltán László; Gergő Tóth; Márk Horváth; Gábor Gyenes; Attila Hegedűs	Poland; Łukasz Majksner; Michał Żukowski; Michał Zajk; Marek Gorzecki; Paweł Tarasiński	Swap2
2020	Cancelled due to the COVID-19 pandemic				
2022	Not organised				
2024	Xintai, China	Organised but not played			

== Computers and gomoku ==
Researchers have been applying artificial intelligence techniques to playing gomoku for several decades. Joseph Weizenbaum published a short paper in Datamation in 1962 entitled "How to Make a Computer Appear Intelligent" that described the strategy used in a gomoku program that could beat novice players.

In 1994, L. Victor Allis raised the algorithm of proof-number search (pn-search) and dependency-based search (db-search), and proved that when starting from an empty 15×15 board, the first player has a winning strategy using these searching algorithms. This applies to both free-style gomoku and standard gomoku without any opening rules. It seems very likely that black wins on larger boards too. In any size of a board, freestyle gomoku is an m,n,k-game, hence it is known that the first player can force a win or a draw.

In 2001, Allis's winning strategy was also approved for renju, a variation of gomoku, when there was no limitation on the opening stage. However, neither the theoretical values of all legal positions, nor the opening rules such as Swap2 used by the professional gomoku players have been solved yet, so the topic of gomoku artificial intelligence is still a challenge for computer scientists, such as the problem on how to improve the gomoku algorithms to make them more strategic and competitive. Most state-of-the-art gomoku algorithms are based on the alpha-beta pruning framework.

Reisch proved that Generalized gomoku is PSPACE-complete. He also observed that the reduction can be adapted to the rules of k-in-a-Row for fixed k. Although he did not specify exactly which values of k are allowed, the reduction would appear to generalize to any k ≥ 5. There exist several well-known tournaments for gomoku programs since 1989.

The Computer Olympiad started with the gomoku game in 1989, but gomoku has not been in the list since 1993. The Renju World Computer Championship was started in 1991, and held for 4 times until 2004. The Gomocup tournament has been held annually since 2000, with more than thirty participants from about ten countries taking part.

The Hungarian Computer Go-Moku Tournament was played twice in 2005. There were also two Computer vs. Human tournaments played in the Czech Republic, in 2006 and 2011. Not until 2017 did the computer programs prove capable of outperforming the world human champion in public competitions. In the Gomoku World Championship 2017, there was a match between the world champion program Yixin and the world champion human player Rudolf Dupszki. Yixin won the match with a score of 2–0.

== In popular culture ==
Gomoku was featured in a 2018 Korean film by Baek Seung-Hwa starring Park Se-wan titled Omok Girl. The film follows Baduk Lee (Park Se-wan), a former go prodigy who retired after a humiliating loss on time. Years later, Baduk Lee works part time at a go club, where she meets Ahn Kyung Kim, who introduces her to an Omok (Korean gomoku) tournament. Lee is initially uninterested and considers Omok a children's game, but after her roommate loses money on an impulse purchase, she enters the tournament for the prize money and loses badly, being humiliated once again. Afterwards, she begins training to redeem herself and becomes a serious omok player.

In the video game Vintage Story, omok boards and pieces (made of gold, lead, and copper) can occasionally be found in ruins or as part of luxury traders' inventory. The board and pieces are functional, allowing players to have actual omok matches. In-universe, omok is so far the only game surviving from the times before the Rot.

== See also ==
- Connect6
- Connection game
- Pegity
- Pente
- Renju
- Reversi
