= Renju opening pattern =

Renju opening pattern is a Renju position with 3 moves made. All debut classifications in Renju are based on patterns.

== Restrictions on first moves ==
- The first move is black and must be played in the center of the board.
- The second move is white and must be played in the center 3x3 square.
- The third move is black and must be played in the center 5x5 square.

== Openings classification ==
Since the second move is to be played in the center 3x3 square, the white stone must be adjacent (vertically, horizontally or diagonally) to the first move. It is clear that due to symmetry any legal opening pattern will fall into one of the following categories:

- Indirect openings - 2nd move is diagonally adjacent to the 1st move
- Direct openings - 2nd move is vertically adjacent to the 1st move

== Indirect openings ==
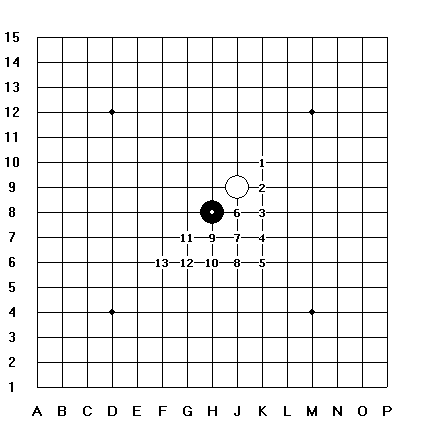
Renju indirect opening patterns

Due to symmetry there are 13 possibilities for the 3rd move as shown on a picture. 1st move is solid black circle, 2nd move is white circle, possible openings are shown enumerated. Brief evaluation for an old RIF opening rule follows.

- 1I (長星) (Chosei): mostly equal, slightly better for White
- 2I (峡月) (Kyogetsu): sure win for Black
- 3I (恒星) (Kosei): sure win for Black
- 4I (水月) (Suigetsu): sure win for Black
- 5I (流星) (Ryusei): slightly better for White
- 6I (雲月) (Ungetsu): sure win for Black
- 7I (浦月) (Hogetsu): sure win for Black
- 8I (嵐月) (Rangetsu): sure win for Black
- 9I (銀月) (Gingetsu): advantage for Black
- 10I (明星) (Myojo): sure win for Black
- 11I (斜月) (Shagetsu): slightly better for Black
- 12I (名月) (Meigetsu): advantage for Black
- 13I (彗星) (Suisei): sure win for White

== Direct openings ==
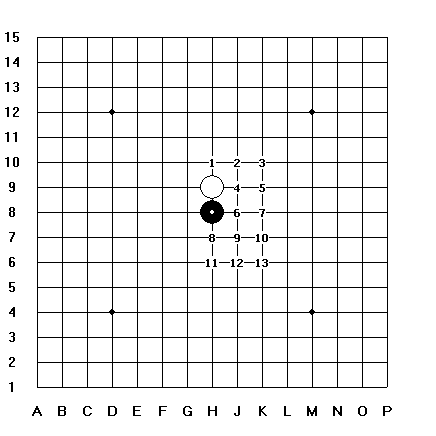
Renju direct opening patterns

Due to symmetry there are 13 possibilities for the 3rd move as shown on a picture. 1st move is solid black circle, 2nd move is white circle, possible openings are shown enumerated. Brief evaluation for an old RIF opening rule follows.

- 1D (寒星) (Kansei): sure win for Black
- 2D (渓月) (Keigetsu): sure win for Black
- 3D (疎星) (Sosei): mostly equal, slightly better for White
- 4D (花月) (Kagetsu): sure win for Black
- 5D (残月) (Zangetsu): advantage for Black
- 6D (雨月) (Ugetsu): sure win for Black
- 7D (金星) (Kinsei): sure win for Black
- 8D (松月) (Shogetsu): slightly better for Black
- 9D (丘月) (Kyugetsu): slightly better for Black
- 10D (新月) (Shingetsu): advantage for Black
- 11D (瑞星) (Zuisei): mostly equal, slightly better for Black
- 12D (山月) (Sangetsu): advantage for Black
- 13D (遊星) (Yusei): sure win for White
