= Renju International Federation =

- Formation: August 8, 1988; 37 years ago
- Type: International organization
- Headquarters: Stockholm, Sweden
- Members: 21 members
- President: Madli Mirme
- Website: renju.net

The Renju International Federation (RIF) is an international organization which was founded in Stockholm, Sweden on August 8, 1988. The main purpose of the federation is to unite all the Renju and gomoku national federations all over the world, organize international tournaments such as World Championships, together with other activities in renju and gomoku, and spread renju activities in the world. The federation carry out the General Assembly every two years.

== The Central Committee ==
The Central Committee is responsible to the current status of the Renju International Federation, together with the activities of the officials of the Federation. According to the status, there are 6 positions in the Central Committee.

Position	Name	Country
President	Madli Mirme	Estonia
Vice President	Norihiko Kawamura	Japan
Vice President	Dmitry Epifanov	Russia
General Secretary	Aivo Oll	Estonia
Treasurer	Stefan Karlsson	Sweden

== Members ==
The Renju International Federation was founded in 1988 by 3 founder members: Japan, Soviet Union and Sweden. Up to 2023, there have been 21 members in the Renju International Federation. The list of members follows.

Member	Year of joining	Status
Japan	1988	Founder Member
Russia	1988	Founder Member (Note: Russia has inherited the place of the Soviet Union since 1992.)
Sweden	1988	Founder Member
Armenia	1988	Member
Canada	2003	Member
China	1996	Member
Macau, China	2015	Member
Chinese Taipei	1999	Member
Czech Republic	2003	Member
Estonia	1988	Member
Greece	2016	Member
Mongolia	2023	Member
South Korea	2001	Member
Poland	2009	Member
Turkey	2015	Member
Ukraine	1988	Member
Uzbekistan	1999	Member
Azerbaijan	1988	Idle
Belarus	1988	Idle
Finland	2003	Idle
Latvia	1988	Idle

== See also ==
- Renju
- Gomoku
- World Championships in Renju
- RIF rating list
