= Podyuga =

Podyuga Подюга
- Settlement
- Interactive map of Podyuga
- Location of Podyuga Podyuga (Arkhangelsk Oblast)
- Coordinates: 61°05′34″N 40°51′58″E
- Country: Russia
- Federal subject: Arkhangelsk Oblast
- Administrative district: Konoshsky District
- SelsovietSelsoviet: Podyuzhsky Selsoviet

Population
  - Estimate (2012): 2,612 )
- Time zone: UTC+3 (MSK)
- Postal code: 164026
- OKTMO ID: 11622426101

Podyuga (Russian: Подюга) is a rural locality (a settlement) and the administrative center of Podyuzhskoye Rural Settlement, Konoshsky District of Arkhangelsk Oblast, Russia.

== Geography ==
It is located on the Podyuga River.
