= Renju =

Traditional board game

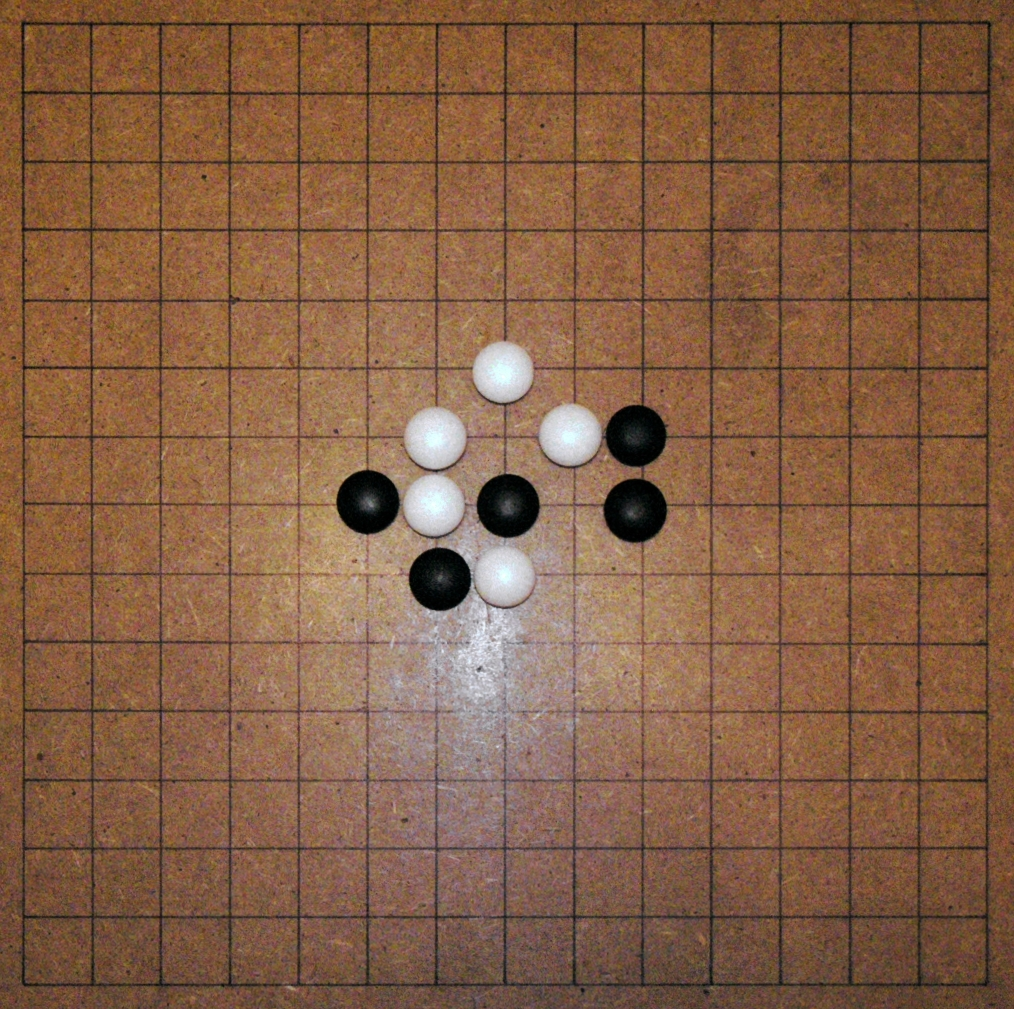
- Renju is played on a 15×15 gridded board. The playing pieces, called stones, are played on the grid line intersections.
- Genres: Board game; Abstract strategy game
- Players: 2
- Setup time: Minimal
- Playing time: Casual games: 5 to 30 minutes; tournament games: from 10 minutes (renju blitz) to 5 hours or longer
- Chance: None
- Skills: Strategy, tactics

Renju (Japanese: 連珠) is a professional variant of the abstract strategy board game gomoku. It was named renju by Japanese journalist Ruikou Kuroiwa (黒岩涙香) on December 6, 1899, in a Japanese newspaper Yorozu chouhou (萬朝報). The name "renju" means "connected pearls" in Japanese. The game is played with black and white stones on a 15×15 gridded go board.

The rule of renju weakens the advantages for the first player (Black) in gomoku by adding special restrictions for Black.

== Rules ==
Renju has its origins in gomoku and therefore shares most of its rules. There are two key differences between these games, however. First, renju has the rule of forbidden moves to limit Black's advantage, something gomoku does not have. Second, renju utilizes special opening rules to balance the starting positions of games.

=== Forbidden moves ===
There are certain moves that Black is not allowed to make:

- Double three – Placing a stone on an intersection, which makes more than one three that meet each other in this intersection.
  - Three – A row with three stones to which one can add one more stone to attain a straight four.
  - Straight four – An unbroken row with four stones to which one can add one more stone to attain five in a row in two different ways.
- Double four – Placing a stone on an intersection, which makes more than one four that meet each other in this intersection.
  - Four – A row with four stones to which one can add one more stone to attain five in a row.
- Overline – Six or more stones in an unbroken row.

If Black makes a forbidden move, then the game will be won for White. One exception is that, if Black makes a forbidden move and attains five in a row at the same time, it will still be considered a win for Black.

=== Pass ===
In the game, a player has the option to give up the right to place a stone on the board, which is referred to as passing. If both players choose to pass consecutively, the game is regarded as a draw.

The right of passing is usually used when the board is almost full and Black will make an overline if he places a stone on the board.

=== Winning ===
Black can win the game only by placing exactly five black stones in a row (vertically, horizontally or diagonally).

White can win by either:

- Getting five (or more) white stones in a row
- Forcing Black to make a forbidden move (see above).

=== Opening rules ===
Unlike gomoku, renju has a unique sequence of opening moves called an "opening rule". There are several certified opening rules. The list of requirements for new opening rules as approved by the Renju International Federation (RIF) in 2003 was:

I. Traditions

- The basic renju rules must be kept.
- The opening stage must not exceed 5 moves.
- All 26 canonical openings must be possible and only 26 canonical openings can be possible.
- All present realistic variants must be possible.
- The moves located very closely near the edges of a board during the opening stage are not preferable.

II. Simplicity and attraction

- New rules must be simple to study.
- New rules must be simple to play for beginners. The situation when in significant part of cases a beginner will have the lost position already after the first 5 moves is not good.
- The rules must be systematic and attractive.

III. Creativity

- The number of possible creative variants must be significantly greater than now. These variants must be achieved under the optimal strategy of both players.
- The chances of sides to win must be practically equal.
- The situation when during the opening stage the player who makes a move is not interested in the forming of equal and creative position is not preferable. (Example: indirect 2nd move in previous opening rules).
- The rules must give the chance for both players to avoid the position after the opening stage well known for the opponent.
- The knowledge of theory and deep own analyses must give an advantage but the player with a good imagination must have chances against this.

An example of such opening rule (namely "RIF opening rule") follows.

1. The first player places 2 black stones and 1 white stone on the board thus forming opening pattern.
2. The second player now chooses whether to play black or white.
3. White then places one more stone on the board.
4. Black places 2 stones on the board.
5. White removes one of the two black stones from the previous move.
6. White places a white stone.

After this sequence is complete, Black and White continue to take turns to place their stones.

The Extra General Assembly of Renju International Federation in 2008 created three new sets of rules for openings that are to replace the above old sequence of moves: Soosõrv, Taraguchi, and Yamaguchi. Also a rejection system for their use was approved. The General Assembly of Renju International Federation in 2009 certified Sakata opening rule as proposed by Russia. The General Assembly of Renju International Federation in 2011 certified modified opening rules such as Taraguchi-N and Soosõrv-N.

For the opening rule of both the World Renju Championship and the Team World Renju Championship, Swap opening rule was used before 1996. However, during the Extra General Assembly 1996, RIF opening rule was approved as the official rule for World Championships, starting from World Championship 1997. Subsequently, the official rule was changed to Yamaguchi opening rule from World Championship 2009, during the Extra General Assembly 2008. Then, during the General Assembly 2015, the official rule was changed once again to Soosõrv-8 opening rule from World Championship 2017.

== Renju International Federation ==
The Renju International Federation (RIF) is an international organization which was founded in Stockholm, Sweden on August 8, 1988. The main purpose of the Renju International Federation is to unite all the renju and gomoku national federations all over the world, organize international tournaments and other activities in renju and gomoku, and spread renju activities in the world. The federation carries out the General Assembly every two years.

== World Championships ==
There are several world championships organized by the Renju International Federation, including World Championship, Women World Championships, Team World Championships, Youth World Championships and Correspondence World Championships.

Renju World Championships have occurred every second year, since 1989. The opening rule was Yamaguchi from 2009 to 2015, Soosõrv-8 from 2017 to 2023, and has been changed to Taraguchi-10 since 2025. The Women World Championships started in 1997 and are played every second year, at the same time and place with the World Championships.

Team World Championships in Renju have occurred every second year since 1996. From 2010 to 2016, the opening rule used was Yamaguchi, in 2018 Soosõrv-8, and since 2024 the rule has been changed to Taraguchi-10.

World Championships in Renju via Correspondence were held in 1982 to 1993 (by paper letters, later by e-mails), and now are played every year since 1996 with an exception in 2009, 2010 and 2016.

== Computers and renju ==
Free Renju was solved in 2001 as a win for the first player. However, renju with modern opening rules such as Yamaguchi and Soosõrv-N has not been solved.

The Renju World Computer Championship was started in 1991, and held for four times until 2004. From 2016, Renju was added to the Gomocup tournament, taking place every year, still active now.

The first program playing with human players in public competitions was Meijin-2000 developed by Oleg Stepanov, Russia. In 2000, Meijin-2000 played against human players in Moscow Open Tournament. However, not until 2017 were the computer programs proved to be able to outperform top human players in public competitions. In 2017, there was a match between the world champion program Yixin and Taiwan's Meijin title holder Lin Shu-Hsuan, and Yixin won the match with 3-1. In 2018, there was a match between Yixin and the former world champion Qi Guan, and the match ended in a draw with 2.5-2.5.

== See also ==
- Renju International Federation
- World Championships in Renju
- Meijin (renju)
- RIF rating list
- Pente
- Connect6
- Go (board game)
- Game complexity
