= List of mancala games =

Games in the mancala family include:

== Popular games ==
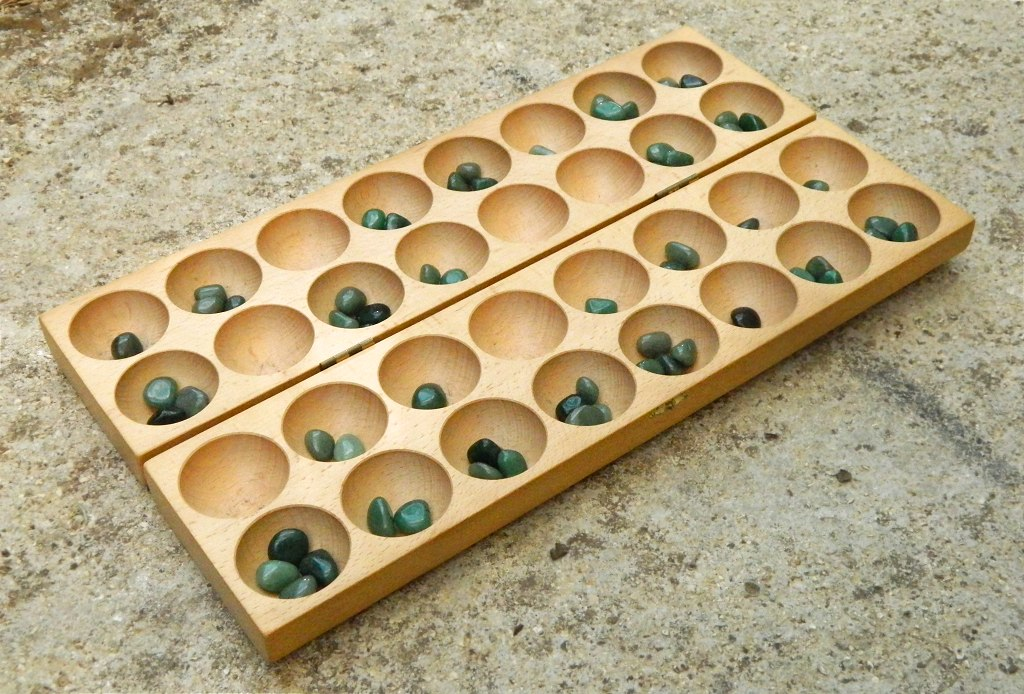
A modern, European Bao/Omweso board with jade gemstones

The most widely played games are probably:

- Bao is a complex strategy game of Kenya and Tanzania, played on a 4×8 board.
- Kalah is the ruleset usually included with commercially available boards; however, the game is heavily biased towards the first player, and it is often considered a children's game. The board is 2×6 with stores. The Pie rule can be used to balance the first-player's advantage.
- Oware, the national game of Ghana, is also known by Warri, Ayo (Yoruba Name. Nigeria), Awele, Awari, Ouril, and other names. It has relatively simple rules but considerable strategic depth. The board is 2×6 (not counting optional stores).
- Omweso (also known as coro) is a strategic game of Uganda, played on a 4×8 board.
- Pallanguzhi is played in Tamil Nadu, Southern India with 2 x 7 stores. Two varieties of this game are popular, Kaashi and Bank.

== Games with unusual features ==
- Bohnenspiel is a German mancala based on a Persian game not unlike some African mancala variants. The board is 2×6 with 2 stores.
- ǁHus is a Namibian game. The board is 4×8.

== Modern adaptations ==
- Bantumi, featured on many early Nokia phones such as the Nokia 3310
- Conga (Martin Franke; Germany)
- Cups (Arthur Amberstone and Wald Amberstone; United States: New York)
- Devil Bunny Hates the Earth, where you try to save the world by jamming taffy machines. (James Ernest and Cheapass Games; United States: Seattle, Washington)
- Oh-Wah-Ree is a commercial variant of Oware with provision for more than two players.
- 55Stones is a modern mancala game with simultaneous moves.
- Kauri is a modern mancala game with two kinds of seeds.
- Mangala (Serdar Asaf Ceyhan; Turkey)
- Space Walk is a modern boardgame with mancala mechanic.
- Trajan is a modern boardgame variant with mancala mechanic.
- Five Tribes is a modern boardgame variant with mancala mechanic.
- Ostia is a modern boardgame variant with mancala mechanic.

== Traditional variants ==
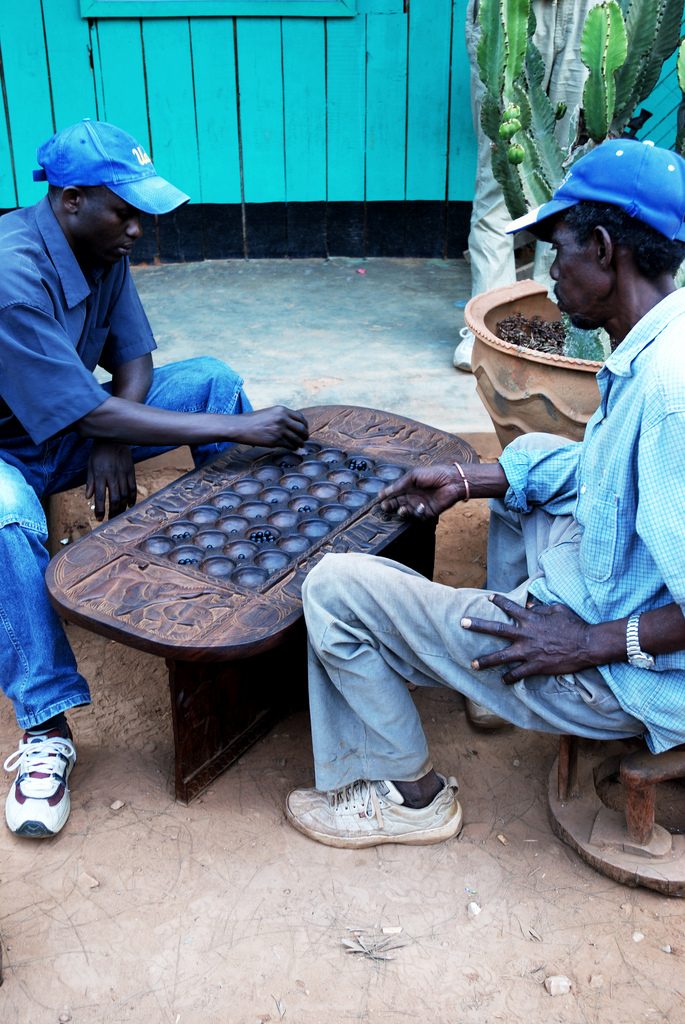
Omweso (or Igisoro) players in Kigali, Rwanda

- Abangah (the Azande of Sudan) The board is 2×8 with stores.
- Adji-boto (Suriname)
- Agsinnoninka (Philippines)
- Alemungula (Ethiopia and Sudan)
- Ali Guli Mane (India—Karnataka)
- Andada (Kunama of Eritrea)
- Anywoli (Ethiopia, Sudan)
- Aw-li On-nam Ot-tjin (Borneo)
- Aweet (Sudan, Namibia)
- Ayoayo (Yoruba of Nigeria)
- Ba-awa (Ghana) The board is 2×6 with stores.
- Bajangkaq (Sumatra)
- Bāqūra (Mesopotamia)
- Bay Khom (Cambodia)
- Bau (the Wa Chaga)
- Beatta (Tayma)
- Bohnenspiel (Germany)
- Chenna Maaney (In Tulu language, South India)
- Chisolo (Zambia)
- Chonka (Borneo)
- Chongka, or Tchonka (Marianas)
- Choro
- Chuncajon (Philippines)
- Congkak (Indonesia, Malaysia) The board is 2×7 with stores.
- Coro (Lango region of Uganda)
- Dakon (Java island of Indonesia)
- Dara-dara (Indonesia—Sulawesi)
- Daramutu (Sri Lanka)
- Ellaewala-kanda (Sri Lanka)
- El Arnab (Kababish of Sudan)
- En Gehé (Maasai of Tanzania)
- Endodoi (Maasai of Kenya and Tanzania)
- Enkeshui (Maasai of Kenya and Tanzania)
- Eson xorgol (Kazakhs of Western Mongolia)
- Gabata (Ethiopia)
- Galatjang (Sulawesi)
- Giuthi (Kikuyu, Embu of Kenya)
- Göçürme (Turkey)
- Halusa (Mesopotamia)
- Hawalis (Oman)
- Hoyito (Dominican Republic)
- Igisoro (Rwanda - Burundi)
- Ingilith (the Turkana of Kenya)
- Isafu
- Isafuba
- Isolo (Sukuma of Tanzania)
- J'erin (Nigeria)

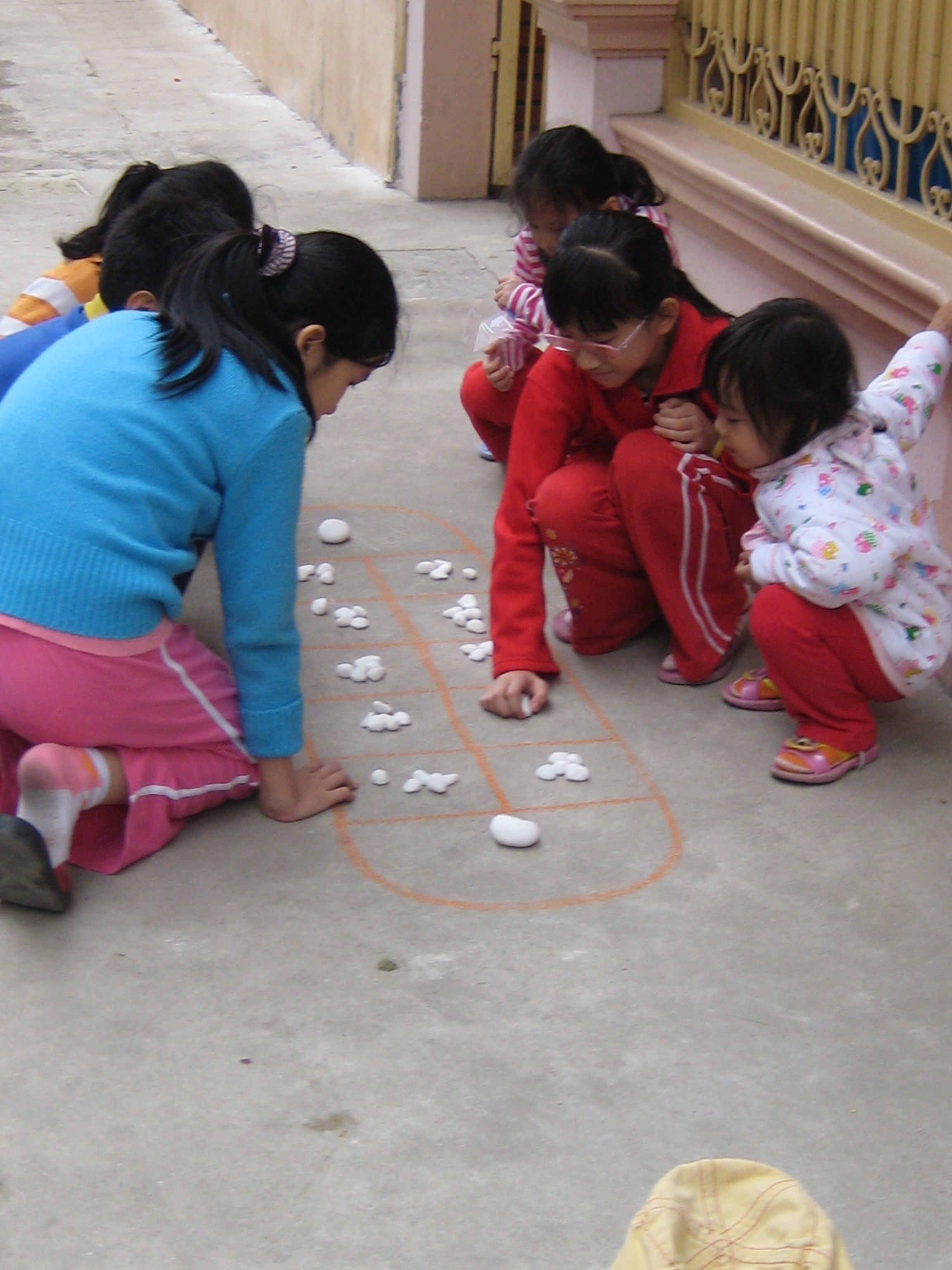
Vietnamese children playing ô ăn quan

- Kakumei (Japan)
- Kale (Gabon)
- Kaloleh (Sumatra)
- Kapo (Senegal)
- Kanji guti (India—Odisha)
- Katro (Betsileo of Madagascar)
- Khutka boia (India—Punjab)
- Kiela (Angola)
- Kiothi (Meru of Kenya)
- Kisolo (also spelled Chisolo) (DR Congo and Zimbabwe)
- Kotu-baendum (Sri Lanka)
- Kombe (Kenya)
- Köçürme (Kırgızistan)
- Krur (Hassaniya of Western Sahara)
- Kubuguza
- La'b Madjnuni (Syria)
- La'b Hakimi, or La'b Akila (Syria)
- La'b Roseya (Syria)
- Lamlameta (Konso people of Ethiopia)
- Latho (Dorzé of Ethiopia)
- Layli Goobalay (Somalia)
- Li'b al-ghashim
- Longbeu-a-cha (India—Assam)
- Lontu-Holo (the Maroon of Suriname)
- Madji (the Benni of Nigeria)
- Main chakot (Thailand)
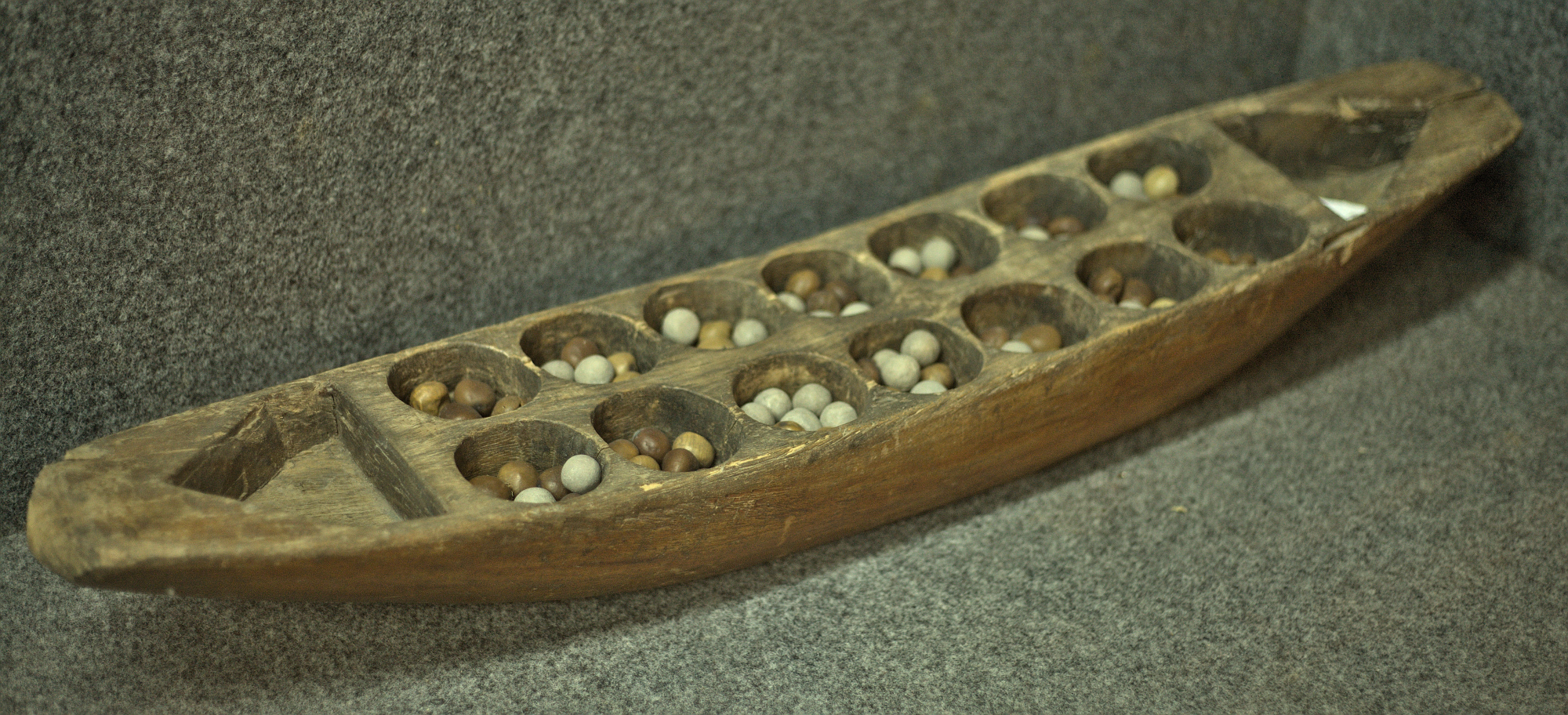
  Thai Mancala board (possibly Mai Chakot or Mak Khom), as displayed in the Institute of Southern Thai Studies near Songkhla.
- Mak Khom (Thailand)
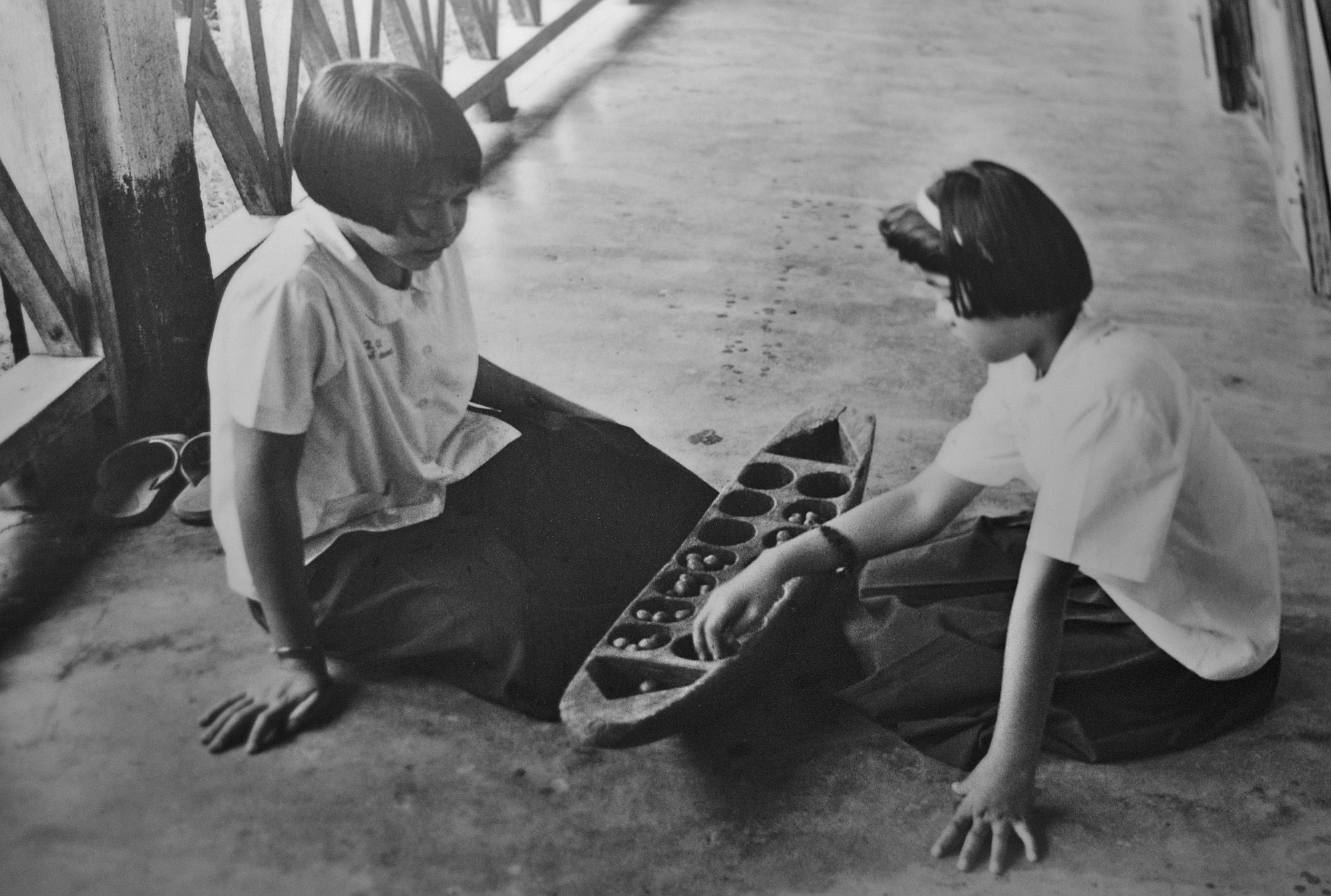
  Photograph of two Thai girls playing with a mancala board, possibly the game Main Chakot or Mak Khom.
- Makonn (Seychelles)
- Mancala'h (Egypt, Syria)
- Mandoli (Greece— Hydra)
- Mangala (Egypt, Turkey - different rules)
- Mangola (Congo, Rwanda)
- Matoe (Indonesia—Sumba)
- Mawkar katiya (India—Assam)
- Mbau (Kenya— Kilimanjaro region of the Rift Valley)
- Mbothe (Pokomo people of Kenya)
- Mechiwa (Bali)
- Mefuvha
- Melegayası (Turkey) The board is 2×9 with stores.
- Mereköçdü (Azerbaijan) The board is a circle of six holes. Each player has 21 stones.
- Meuchoh (Sumatra—Aceh)
- Meulieh (Sumatra—Aceh)
- Meusueb (Sumatra—Aceh)
- Meuta' (Sumatra—Aceh)
- Minkale (Bin Kale) (Turkey)
- Mongale (Kenya)
- Naranj (Maldives)
- Nchorokoto (the Igbo people of Nigeria)
- Nsolo (Zambia)
- Ntxuva (Mozambique) A traditional game from sub-Saharan Africa with most likely origins in Egypt.
- Ô ăn quan (Viet Nam) game is 2 mandarin boxes x5 ponds each, with 25 stones or tamarind seeds each
- Obridjie (Nigeria)
- Olo (the Esan people of Nigeria)
- Ouril (Cape Verde)
- Oh’valhu-gondi (Maldives) 2 players play with cowrie shells.
- Pachgarhwa (India)
- Pallanguzhi (Tamil of India), also known as Pallankuli.
- Pereauni (Uganda)
- Poo (Liberia)
- Puhulmuti (Sri Lanka)
- Sai (Flores)
- Sat-gol (India)
- Songo
- Sungka (Philippines)
- Til-guti (India)
- Tsoro (Zimbabwe)
- Toee (Sudan)
- Togyzkumalak (Kazakhstan)
- Toguz korgool (Kyrgyzstan) The board is 2×9 with stores.
- Ünee tugalluulakh (Kazakhs of Mongolia)
- Vaamana Guntalu (Telugu name, India - Andhra Pradesh)
- Vai Lung Thlan (the Mizo in Mizoram, India)
- Walak-pussa (Sri Lanka)
- Warra (United States)
- Wa-wee (Saint Lucia)
- 散窯 (Sàn yáo) (China—Henan)
- 老牛棋 (Lǎo niú qí) (China—Anhui)
- 分六煲棋 (Fēn liù bāo qí) (China—Guangdong)
