= Traditional games of Nigeria =

Nigeria has several traditional games, though many have faded away due to lack of support and the dominance of Western sports. Traditional games historically played a significant role in teaching Nigerian children about the structure of their societies.

== History ==
Several traditional Nigerian games are played at the National Sports Festival of Nigeria.

== Traditional games ==
=== Abula ===
Abula is similar to volleyball, except that participants hit the ball with a wooden bat.

=== After round one ===
After singing a song with the opening line "after round one", players have to display a number from one to five using their fingers; the person who displays the lowest numbers of fingers has their palm slapped by all the other participants.

=== Langa ===
Langa is played in rounds; in each round, one player from each team, known as the Ruwa (point-scorer), attempts to reach a designated area on the opponent's side in order to score a point for their team. The Ruwas and all other players have to hop on one foot, while holding their other foot with one hand. A player whose hand is dislodged from their held foot by an opponent is eliminated from that round.

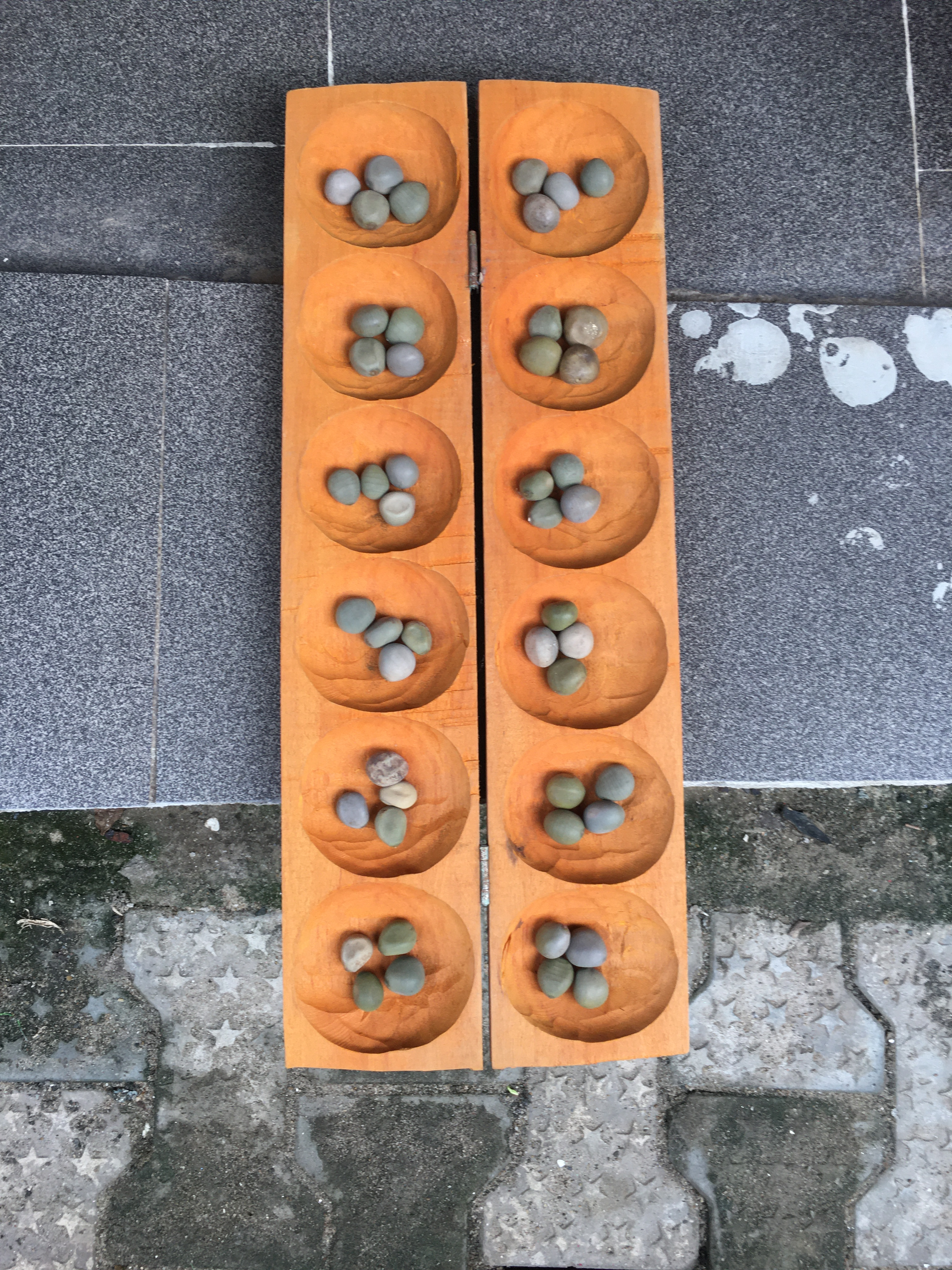
Nigerian game

=== Ten Ten ===
Two participants stand opposing each other, and then lift one of their legs up; if a player lifts the same leg up as the opponent, then the opponent wins a point.

==== Kpokoro ====
Kpokoro is a version of Ten Ten which involves multiple players, and also resembles follow the leader.

== Board games ==
=== Ayoayo ===
Ayo (Yoruba: Ayò Ọlọ́pọ́n) is a traditional mancala played by the Yoruba people in Nigeria. It is very close to the Oware game that spread to the Americas with the Atlantic slave trade. Among modern mancalas, which are most often derived from Warri, the Kalah is a notable one that has essentially the same rules as Ayo.

There are games with identical rules also in other areas of Africa. One such game is Endodoi, played by the Maasai people of Kenya and Tanzania.

=== Arin ===
Arin is similar to billiards, except that it is played using seeds as the items that are maneuvered around.

== Martial arts ==
=== Dambe ===
Dambe is a martial art of the Hausa people from Nigeria. Competitors in a typical match aim to subdue each other into total submission mostly within three rounds. It often results in serious bodily injury. Boxers are called by the Hausa word "Yan Dambe".

=== Kokawa ===
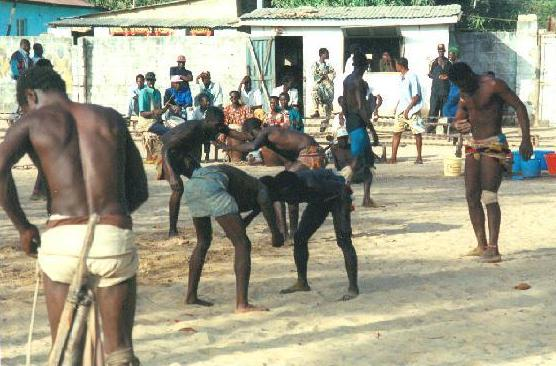

Lutte Traditionnelle (fr. for Traditional Wrestling) is a style of West African folk wrestling, known as Laamb in Senegal and in the Gambia, Evala in Togo, and KoKowa / Kokawa in Hausa areas of Nigeria and Niger, or simply Lutte Traditionnelle, in Niger and Burkina Faso. International competition takes place during the Jeux de la Francophonie and the newly organised Championship of African Lutte Traditionnelle.
