= Kiothi =

Kiothi is a traditional mancala game played by the Meru people in Kenya. The word "kiothi" simply means "to place" (i.e., placing the seeds in the pits). This mancala is closely related to the Enkeshui and the Giuthi mancalas, respectively played by the Maasai, the Kikuyu and Embu people.

== Rules ==
The Kiothi board is 2x10, i.e., 2 rows of 10 pits each. Each player owns a row and 30 seeds. At game setup, seeds are placed in the 5 rightmost pits of each player's row, 6 per pit. Before the game starts, anyway, each player can take the seeds from one of his pits and distribute those seeds freely on the board (including in the opponent's pits).

At his or her turn, the player takes all the seeds from one of his pits and relay-sows them counterclockwise. When the last seed is dropped in an empty pit:

- if the pit is in the opponent's row, the turn is over;
- if the pit is in the player's row, and the sowing has crossed the opponent's row, the seed is captured; any seeds in the opponent's opposite pit are also captured.

As an exception to the above, seeds in any pit cannot be captured if the player owning the pit has never been sowing (or relay sowing) from that pit.

Another exception is that if the capturing seed was dropped in the leftmost of the player's pits, and the opponent's opposite pit is non empty and it is followed by a sequence of non empty pits, then seeds from all those adjacent non empty pits are captured.

When a player cannot move anymore, the opponent captures all the seeds remaining on the board. The player who captured most seeds wins.
