= Sport in Nigeria =

Football is largely considered Nigeria's national sport, and the country has its own professional football league. Basketball is the second sport of Nigeria.

== History ==
=== Colonial era ===
Physical education was made part of colonial Nigeria's educational curriculum in the 19th century. During this time, indigenous sports faded away while structured European activities such as football, which helped to bridge the gap between the British rulers and the local population, grew.

=== Contemporary era ===
Other than football, basketball, handball and volleyball are also prominent in the Nigerian sports sector. Indigenous games such as loofball, dambe and ayo also have significant popularity among youths in Nigeria. Loofball involves two teams of five, a ball, and a net. It is played by tossing the ball over the net to the opposing team's side of the court. After July 2021, the sport has been administered by the LSDI (Loofball Sports Development Initiative).

== Team sports ==
=== Association football ===
The Nigerian national football team, nicknamed the "Super Eagles", is the national team of Nigeria, run by the Nigeria Football Federation (NFF). According to the FIFA World Rankings, Nigeria ranks 42nd and holds the sixth-highest place among the African nations. The highest position Nigeria ever reached on the ranking was 5th, in April 1994. Supporters of English football clubs like Manchester United, Arsenal, Manchester City, Liverpool and Chelsea often segregate beyond the traditional tribal and even religious divide to share their common cause in Premier League teams.

=== Basketball ===
Nigeria's national basketball team made the headlines internationally when it became the first African team to beat the United States men's national team. In earlier years, Nigeria qualified for the 2012 Summer Olympics as it beat heavily favoured world elite teams such as Greece and Lithuania. Nigeria has been home to numerous internationally recognised basketball players in the world's top leagues in America, Europe and Asia. These players include Basketball Hall of Famer Hakeem Olajuwon, and later players in the NBA. The Nigerian Premier League has become one of the biggest and most-watched basketball competitions in Africa. The games have aired on Kwese TV and have averaged a viewership of over a million people.

==== Attendances ====
The average home league attendances in the 2024 NBBF Premier League:

Team	Average
Rivers Hoopers	649
Lagos Legends	619
Kano Pillars	599
Nigeria Customs	550
Gombe Bulls	502
Delta Force	452
Gboko City Chiefs	402
Kwara Falcons	398
Police Baton	349
Hoops and Read	303
Ebun Comets	251
Oluyole Warriors	250
Plateau Peaks	198
Correctional	155
Nile University Spartans	153
Bauchi Nets	149
Average	374

=== Bobsled ===
Nigeria made history by qualifying the first bobsled team for the Winter Olympics from Africa when their women's two-person team qualified for the bobsled competition at the XXIII Olympic Winter Games.

=== Curling ===
In 2018, the Nigerian Curling Federation was established to introduce a new sport to the country in order to make the game part of the curriculum at the elementary, high school, and university levels. At the 2019 World Mixed Doubles Curling Championship in Norway, Nigeria won their first international match beating France 8–5.

=== Volleyball ===
Nigeria's women's and men's national teams in beach volleyball competed at the 2018–2020 CAVB Beach Volleyball Continental Cup. The country's U21 national teams qualified for the 2019 FIVB Beach Volleyball U21 World Championships.
