= Andada (game) =

Eritrean board game

Andada is a traditional mancala game played by the Kunama people of western Eritrea. It closely resembles other mancalas from East Africa such as Enkeshui and Layli Goobalay.

== Rules ==
The Andada board comprises two rows of holes; the number of holes per row may vary from 12 to 24, but is always a multiple of 3. Holes are traditionally called ita (meaning "houses"). At the beginning, two seeds are placed in each hole. Seeds are called ayla ("cows"). Each player owns the row of holes closest to him.

The game is opened by a special move made by one of the players, who will take all seeds from one of his holes and sows them counterclockwise; then takes the seeds from the hole immediately after the one where the first sowing has ended and sows them too, and so on, repeating this procedure until all holes have either 3 or 0 seeds. This will lead the board in one of the following situations (assuming the board has 12 holes per row):

The opponent then will choose who will move first in the remainder of the game.

Players will then take turns as in other mancalas. At his/her turn, the player takes all seeds from a hole and sows them counterclockwise. If the last seed falls in a non empty hole, the player will take all seeds from that hole and sow them too (relay sowing). When the last seed falls in an empty hole, if this hole is in the player's own row, he will capture any seeds in the opposing hole in the opponent's row. Captured seeds are removed from the game.

When no hole holds more than 1 seed, any seed that reaches the end of one player's row will be removed from the game instead of moved to the opponent's row.

The first player to be without any seeds in his row loses the game.
