= Togyzkumalak =

Kazakh board game

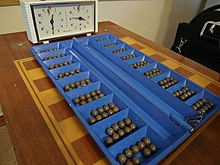
Game board for togyzkumalak

Togyzkumalak (Kazakh: тоғызқұмалақ, romanized: toğızqumalaq, lit. 'nine pebbles') is a mancala-family game played in Kazakhstan. Similar games are played in Turkic-speaking nations, such as toguz korgool in Kyrgyzstan, Mangala in Turkey, and mere köçdü in Azerbaijan. It also played among the Kazakh minority of China and Mongolia. There is a slight difference between these games regarding rules and game terms.

The rules of togyzkumalak were codified in 1949 by Mukhtar Auezov and Kalibek Kuanishbayev. These rules became a basis for tournaments to this day.

The game is popular throughout the world. According to togyzkumalak master Ainur Jakapbaeva, in 2018 there was around 190,000 professional players and 300 trainers in Kazakhstan.. Outside Kazakhstan, the game is quite popular in Germany, the Czech Republic, and Lithuania. The Lithuanian Togyzkumalak Federation opened in 2021. The World Togyzkumalak Championship has been held every 2 years from 2010.

== Competitions ==
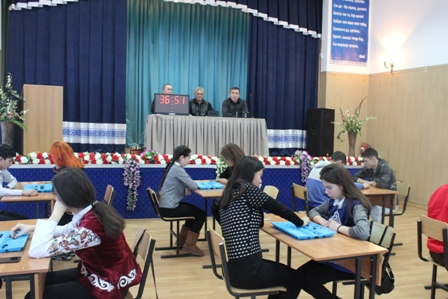
Togyzkumalak tournament in Astana

The first contemporary togyzkumalak tournament was held in 1948 in Almaty, Kazakh Soviet Socialist Republic there were disputes around the rules which were not standardized. That was led to the unification and standardization of rules in 1949.

The first Togyzmkumalak World Championship was held on November 1-7, 2010 in Astana, Kazakhstan. The 25 participants of the men's championship represented 14 nations: Antigua and Barbuda, China, Germany, Georgia, Kazakhstan, Kyrgyzstan, Mongolia, Russia, Spain, Switzerland, Turkey, Turkmenistan, USA, and Uzbekistan. The 18 players of the women's championship came from 10 countries: Azerbaijan, China, Czech Republic, Kazakhstan, Kyrgyzstan, Mongolia, Russia, Turkey, Turkmenistan, and Uzbekistan. Four nations sent full teams (3 players) in each gender: Kazakhstan, Kyrgyzstan, Mongolia and Russia. Uzbekistan had a full male team.

Chronology of World Togyzkumalak Championships:

- 2010 World Championship was held in Astana, Kazakhstan.
- 2012 World Togyzkumalak Championship was held in Pardubice, Czechia
- 2015 World Togyzkumalak Championship was held in Almaty, Kazakhstan
- 2017 World Togyzkumalak Championship was held in Astana, Kazakhstan
- 2019 World Togyzkumalak Championship was held in Antalya, Turkey
- 2022 World Togyzqumalaq Championship was held in Aqtobe, Kazakhstan
- 2023 World Togyzqumalaq Championship U15, U17 was held for The First time in Almati, Kazakhstan
- 2024 World Togyzqumalaq Championship was held in Astana, Kazakhstan in the frame of the World Nomade Games

There is also an World Championship in Togyzkumalak Computer Programs among developers. In 2015, city of Pardubice, the Czech Republic, held the III World Championship in togyzkumalak computer programs.The first place went to Kazakhstan's program developed by Yernar Shambayev, Diana Kenina and Serik Aktayev (6 points). The second place was won by a program made by Kyrgyz developers and the third place went to a computer program of Czech Republic.

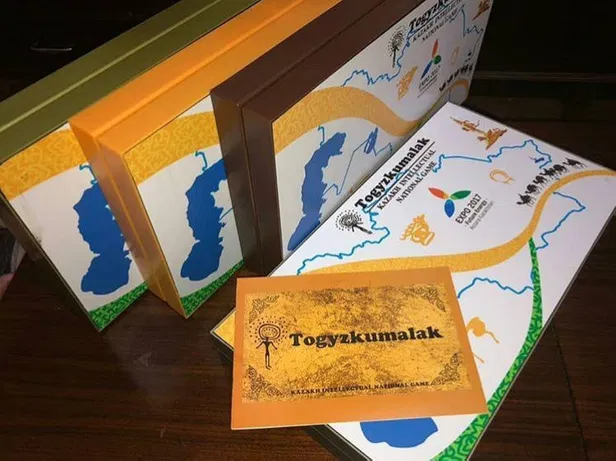
Togyzkumalak mass-produced game set

== History and Research ==
Togyzkumalak rules and terms were firstly described in the literature by Kazakh scientist and linguist Sarsen Amanzholov in 1936. In 19-century Russian ethnographers have mentioned togyzkumalak game during the field research in Kazakh steppes, as a Kirghiz game (Kirgizskaya igra)due to common mistakes messing ethnonyms: Kazakhs as "Kirghiz" or "Kirghiz-Kasaks" and modern Kyrgyz people as "Kara-Kirghiz". For example, Russian ethnographer Boris Kuftin written article "Kirgizskaya Igra Togyz Kumalak"(Kirghiz game of togyzkumalak) in 1906.

In 1974 Federation of Togyzkumalak of Kazakh SSR was formed. It was reestablished in 2004 as a Togyzkumalak Federation of Kazakhstan. There is also World Togyzkumalak Federation.

In 2020, "Traditional intelligence and strategy game: Togyzqumalaq, Toguz Korgool, Mangala/Göçürme" was inscribed on the UNESCO List of the Intangible Cultural Heritage of Humanity through a joint submission by Kazakhstan, Kyrgyzstan, and Turkey.

== Rules ==
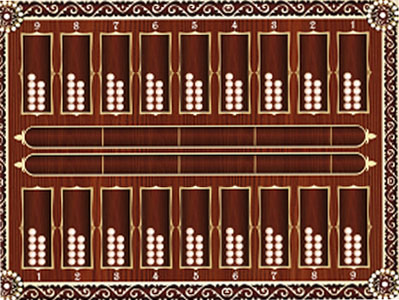
Initial position of the game

The game togyz kumalak uses a special board with two rows of small holes, called "otau" (nine in each row) and two base holes, which are called "kazan". The player's "Kazan" is closer to the opponent's side. At the beginning of the game, there are 162 stones, called "kumalaks" nine stones in each small hole. A player wins the game if he collects 82 stone in his "kazan" If each player has the same number of stones in the kazan, then the game is a draw.

Game terms of contemporary standardized togyzkumalak competitions:

- Otau - (Kazakh: nest)pit
- Kazan - (Kazakh: kettle) store
- Kumalak -(Kazakh: sheep droppings)playing balls
- Tuzdik - (Kazakh: kettle)acquired accumulation pit
- Atsyz kalu - (Kazakh: losing horse)situation where the player has no bals left to move
- Bastaushi - (Kazakh: starter)first player
- Kostaushi - (Kazakh: follower)second player

There is another variation of the game - bestemshe (by five) simplified version for kids and kozdatu.
