= Lamlameta =

Lamlameta is a traditional mancala game played by the Konso people living in the Olanta area of central Ethiopia. It was first described in 1971 by British academic Richard Pankhurst. It is usually played by men. The name "Lamlaleta" means "in couples".

== Rules ==
The board used to play Lamlameta, called toma tagéga, comprises 2 rows (one per player) of 12 pits each; pits are termed awa. At game setup, two seeds (tagéga) are placed in each pit.

At his turn, the player takes all the seeds from one of his pits and relay-sows them counterclockwise. Usually, the opening move is from one of the two rightmost pits. With the sole exception of the opening move (meaning the first move of the first player), in all subsequent sowings any opponent's pit holding exactly two seeds is skipped.

The player's move ends when the last seed of a sowing is dropped in an empty pit. If that pit is in the player's own row, and the opposite pit in the opponent's row contains exactly two seeds, then a capture occurs. In this case, all of the opponent's seeds in any pit containing two seeds are removed from the board.

The game ends when one of the players has no seeds left. The opponent then captures all the seeds that are left on the board. The winner is the player who captured the most seeds.

== See also ==
- Latho, another traditional Ethiopian game described by Pankhurst
