= Krur =

Traditional African mancala game

- Ranks: Two
- Sowing: Multiple lap
- Region: Sahara

Krur (also spelled Crur) is a traditional mancala game played by the Hassaniya people in western Sahara, along the border of Nigeria and Mauritania, in southern Morocco, in Algeria, in northern Senegal, in Mali and in Niger. It is a children's game, very close to other simple African mancala such as Layli Goobalay (Somalia) and Nsa Isong (Nigeria).

== Rules ==
The game of Krur is usually called a match. The board has two rows with four holes in each row. At the beginning of each game, each hole starts off with four seeds. Each player controls their side of the board with the four holes on their side.

On the players turn, they pick up the contents of one of the holes and puts them in each hole in an anti clockwise direction. The turn ends once the seed is put into an empty hole. The turn also ends if a seed is put into a hole of the opponent and it comes to a collection of four seeds and it is marked.

If the last seed of the collection on a turn is dropped into an occupied hole, the player must pick up all the contents and continue until the last seed is dropped into an empty hole. When a seed is put into a hole, the term is called "sowing." Sowing cannot begin from a captured hole.

The game is complete once seeds no longer remain in play. The winner of the game is the player who has captured more seeds than his opponent.

== Notes ==
- Fernando Pinto Cebrián, Juegos saharauis para jugar en la arena. Juegos y juguetes tradicionales del Sáhara, Madrid 1999.
