= Adji-boto =

Traditional board game

Adji-boto is a traditional mancala game played by the Saramaccans, i.e., the Maroons who live on the banks of the Saramacca river, in Suriname. It is similar to some mancalas played in West Africa, especially Benin, and could be regarded as a variation of the Wari game, which is the most common mancala game found in the Americas.

The game plays an important role in the social life of Saramaccans, and it is especially connected to funeral rituals. After someone's death, the game is played for the ten days before burial; at night, the board is left outside in the open so that the yorkas (spirits of the dead) can play with it. The intent is to lure the spirits into the village so that they will eventually accept the dead's spirit in their community. Board can only be manufactured by widows.
