= Tsoro =

Ancient strategy board game

Tsoro is an ancient two-player mathematical strategy board game that has been played for over a thousand years. It has its roots in Zimbabwe and was first described in literature by J. B. Matthews in 1964. Tsoro belongs to the same class of African strategy board games collectively called Mancala, such as Oware, Bao, and Kalah.

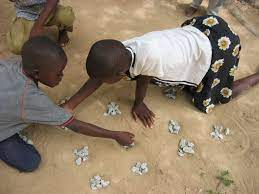
Kids playing Tsoro in Zimbabwe.

Tsoro was played by warriors to improve their enemy capturing and raiding strategies in war situations. It was also used to teach young boys and girls how to count. Kings and chiefs often settled disputes by playing Tsoro. Today it is frequently played during leisure times and sometimes competitively. In its original form, the game was played by digging 4 rows and 21 columns of small holes in the ground which were then populated with a pre-determined amount of pebbles or seeds. Each of the two players occupy two rows of holes.

Tsoro has countless variations in terms of the number of holes in each row and the number of seeds in each hole. In the most common implementation in Zimbabwe, the game is played on a board that has 4 rows with each row containing 7 holes. At the start of the game, all holes are filled with the same number of seeds. The players sit face to face and each player occupies the two rows nearest to them.

Below is a representation of a 10-hole Tsoro board with 2 seeds in each hole at the beginning of a game.

     2 2 2 2 2 2 2 2 2 2
     2 2 2 2 2 2 2 2 2 2
     2 2 2 2 2 2 2 2 2 2
     2 2 2 2 2 2 2 2 2 2

== Rules ==
1. The starting player chooses any hole from his/her set of holes and collects all the seeds in that hole and then distributes them one per hole in the succeeding holes, going in one direction (either clockwise or anti-clockwise). This direction is maintained throughout the game.
2. If the last seed falls into a non-empty hole in the outer row, the player collects all the seeds in that hole and redistributes them into the succeeding holes.
3. If the last seed falls into a hole in the inner row, the player captures all the seeds in his or her opponent's two holes in the same column as his or her hole and distributes them as before.
4. A player's turn ends when the last seed being distributed lands, either in an empty hole in the outer row, or in a hole in the inner row which is in the same column with an empty hole in the opponent's inner row.
5. The game ends when one of the two players has captured all the seeds in the holes of the other player.
6. The winner is the player with all the seeds.

== Difference between Tsoro and Oware ==
The main differences between Tsoro and Oware are as follows:

1. Number of playing rows: While Oware employs one playing row for each player, Tsoro uses 2 playing rows for each player.
2. Number of holes per row: Oware uses a fixed number of holes for each player (6) while for Tsoro, the number of holes can range between 5 and as much as 40
3. Number of starting seeds: Tsoro can be started with any fixed amount of seeds in each hole while Oware requires 4 seeds in each hole before starting.
4. Capturing seeds: In Oware, a placer can capture their own seeds to end a game while in Tsoro one cannot capture their own seeds.

Tsoro is unique in its possession of two rows of playing holes for each player in which seeds can be sown in a clockwise or anti-clockwise direction. While Bao also has 4 rows, there are restrictions concerning which holes a player is allowed to move in.

== Mathematical approaches to optimizing a game of Tsoro ==
Since Tsoro is a turn-based game in which one placer tries to minimize losses and maximize gains, mathematical optimization strategies employing the minimax theory and alpha-beta pruning can be used to solve it for trivial cases. Such solutions exist for some trivial cases involving specific combinations of starting number of seeds and holes.

=== Computer-based Tsoro Games ===
To date, only one website offers a computer-based Tsoro game with multiple levels of difficulty and playing options. For mobile phones, there is a Tsoro game which seems to be available only on the Android platform.
