= Gabata =

Gabata may refer to:

- Gabata, a trade name for Gabapentin
- Gabata, a mancala game played in Ethiopia
