= La'b Madjnuni =

- Ranks: Two
- Sowing: Multilap
- Region: Syria

La'b Madjnuni, also known as Crazy Game, is a mancala game played in Damascus (Syria) in the late 19th century.

== Rules ==
- The La'b Madjnuni board has seven pits, called bute, "houses," in front of each player.
- At the beginning of the game, at least 2 pieces are placed in each pit.
- The first player takes all the pieces from the hole at the right of his row and drops them counterclockwise, one at a time.
- If the last piece ends in an occupied pit, then all the pieces in that pit including the last one are distributed as before.
- These multiple turns continue until the distribution process ends, either the last piece drops into an empty hole, or it drops into a hole containing one or three pieces.
- If the last piece ends up in a pit which, after sowing, contains exactly two or four pieces, all pieces in this pit are captured with those in the hole opposite. Also, if there is a continuous line of pits with either 2 or 4 pieces before the one where the capture has occurred, all the pieces in those and their opposite pits are captured as well.
- Culin wrote that the "game ends when all the pits are empty", but that's not possible. The exact ending rules is, therefore, unknown. The player who captured most pieces wins the game.

La'b roseya is a variant of this game that each hole has seven pieces (cowries) at game setup, and played by children in Syria.

== See also ==
- La'b Hakimi
- List of mancala games
