= Vai Lung Thlan =

Vai Lung Thlan is a variety of the board game mancala variant played by the Mizo people of eastern India. The game is played on a board with 12 holes in two rows. Initially each hole contains five beads.
