= Makonn =

Traditional strategic board game

Makonn is an abstract strategy game from the Seychelles islands off the eastern coast of Africa. The game is a traditional variant of mancala. It is played on four rows of ten holes such as a 10 x 4 hole board. The goal is to capture the opponent's pieces, which is done when one piece jumps across another piece. This game is played mostly on the outer islands of the Seychelles, such as La Digue.

There are variants, and the board design, number of pieces, and rules may change.
