= Latho =

Latho is a traditional solitaire game played by the Dorzé people of Ethiopia. The equipment needed to play the game is similar to that used for mancala games, i.e., a board with 2 rows of 6 "pits", and 30 counters ("seeds"). The game was first described by British academic Richard Pankhurst in 1971.

== Rules ==
At game setup, the 30 seeds are placed in the 2x6 pits according to the following scheme:

2 3 1 3 2 4
2 3 1 3 2 4

Although the game is technically a solitaire, it requires a second person besides the player, who has the function of a "dealer". The dealer and player must first agree about the pit of the board from which to start. The player then closes his eyes (or is blindfolded) and must declare out loud the number of seeds in each of the pits of the board, counterclockwise from the starting pit. The traditional declarations used in Ethiopia are:

- oydo éka ("take from four")
- héza éka ("take from three")
- namo éka ("take from two")
- isimo éka ("take from one")
- afo éka ("don't take")

As long as the declaration is correct (i.e., the pit has that exact number of seeds), the dealer will remove one seed from the pit. The game will thus continue until the board is empty (in which case the player has succeeded) or the player fails to declare the correct number of seeds.

== See also ==
There are several other solitaires based on mancala boards, for example:

- El Arnab (Sudan)
- Tagega (Konso people, Ethiopia)
