= En Gehé =

En Gehé is a traditional mancala game played by the Loitha and Kisonga Maasai groups of northern Tanzania. The game was first described in 1904 by a German soldier, Moritz Merker, who was serving in the Kaiserlichen Schutztruppe in German East Africa. Merker later became the first ethnologist to study the Maasai culture.

En Gehé is traditionally played by men and warriors, and it usually played in teams of six–eight people. According to the Maasai oral history, it was devised by Sindillo, son of the first man Maitoumbe.

== Rules ==
The board used to play En Gehé is one of the biggest mancala boards; it comprises two rows of up to 40-50 pits each. Rows are called el mátuan (sing. ol mátua); pits are called 'n gurtót (sing. en gurtóto). Each team of players own one of the rows. At game setup, there are 4 seeds in each pit, for a total amount of 320-400 seeds needed to play the game. Seeds are called es soido (sing. os soid). Caesalpinia bonduc seeds, or small stones, are traditionally used.

Teams take turns. At one team's turn, one of the team members takes all of the seeds from one of the team's pits and relay-sows them counterclockwise. If the last seed falls in empty pit of the team's row, any seeds in the opposite pit are captured and removed from the game, together with the seed that captured them.

The game ends when one the teams has no seeds in its row. The opponent team captures all the seeds, and the winning team is the one that captured most seeds.
