= List of Vietnamese traditional games =

Vietnamese traditional games:

== Kinh ethnic group's games ==
- Ô ăn quan
- Tổ tôm
- cờ lúa ngô
- Cờ hùm tôm
- Tứ sắc
- Cờ tu hú
- Đánh tam cúc
- Thả diều
- Đánh quay
- Chơi chuyền
- Mèo đuổi chuột
- Rồng rắn lên mây
- Cờ người
- Pháo đất
- Thổi cơm thi
- Chọi gà
- Đua thuyền
- Thìa là thìa lẩy
- Cá sấu lên bờ
- Nu na nu nống
- Thả đỉa ba ba
- Tập tầm vông
- Ném cầu
- Đánh roi múa mộc
- Chơi đu
- Kéo co
- Đập niêu
- Đấu vật
- Bịt mắt bắt dê
- Kéo cưa lừa xẻ
- Vuốt hạt nổ
- Cắp cua bỏ giỏ
- Đánh búng
- Đánh chắt
- Chi chi chành chành
- Rải ranh
- Cướp cầu
- Phụ đồng ếch
- Ném vòng cổ vịt
- Chọi trâu
- Đánh phết
- Lò cò
- Đúc nậm đúc nị
- Nhảy bao bố
- Lộn cầu vồng
- Nhảy ngựa
- Nhảy dây
- Bầu cua cá cọp
- Đá cầu
- Đi cà kheo
- Trốn tìm
- Xỉa cá mè
- Dung dăng dung dẻ

== Hmong ethnic group's games ==
- Ném lao
- Đánh cầu lông gà

== Êđê ethnic group's games ==
- Trò chơi sắc màu
- Trò chơi sỏi đá

== Thái- Tày ethnic group's games ==
- Tó Cối

== Muong ethnic group's games ==
- Đè Khà
