= Daramutu =

Sri Lankan mancala game

Daramutu or Ellaewala-Kandu, is a traditional mancala game from Sri Lanka. It was first described in 1909 by the British engineer Henry Parker in his book Ancient Ceylon (1909). Traditionally, the game is only played by women.

== Rules ==
The game's board (termed olinda-puruwa) comprises two rows of seven pits each. At game setup, four seeds are places in each pit. Seeds of Abrus precatorius are traditionally used. Each player controls one of the rows.

At her turn, the player takes all the seeds in one of her pits and sows them. The first player to play may choose whether sowing occurs clockwise or counterclockwise; after that, all sowing will be done accordingly throughout the game. Sowing is called ihinawa.

If the last seed is sown in a pit that contains at least three seeds, relay-sowing applies. If the last seed falls in an empty pit, or in a pit with exactly one seed (called puta, "son") or in a pit with exactly two seeds (naga, "figlia"), any seeds in the opposite pit are captured. Note that the player can either capture seeds from her own or from the opponent's row, depending on whether her sowing ends in the opponent's or her own row.

When one of the players cannot move, the game is over. All remaining seeds are captured by the opponent, and the winner is the player who captured most seeds.
