= Mbothe =

Kenyan mancala game

Mbothe is a traditional mancala game played by the Pokomo people that live along the Tana River, in Kenya. Pokomo do not traditionally build gameboards; they dig pits in the ground and use small stones as counters.

== Rules ==
Mbothe is played on a 2x10 mancala board (2 rows of 10 pits each). At game setup, two stones are placed in each pit.

At his or her turn, the player takes all the stones from one of his or her pits and relay-sows them counterclockwise.

Pits with two stones in them play a special role in the game. When sowing, any opponent's pit with exactly 2 stones in it must be skipped. Also, sowing cannot be started from a pit that contains 2 stones, unless there are no alternatives; in this case, the rightmost pit must be chosen. As this rule also applies to the first move, the first move of the first player is fixed (i.e., sowing starts from the rightmost pit of the player's row).

When the last stone falls in an empty pit in the player's row and the opposite pit in the opponent's row contains exactly two stones, those are captured by the player and removed from the game. In this case, the player also gets another turn.

If a player ends up his or her turn with no stone in his or her row, the other player has to choose a move whereby some stone will replenish the opponent's row.

The game ends when one of the players cannot move anymore. The opponents captures all the seeds on the board. The player who captured most seeds wins the game.
