= Enkeshui =

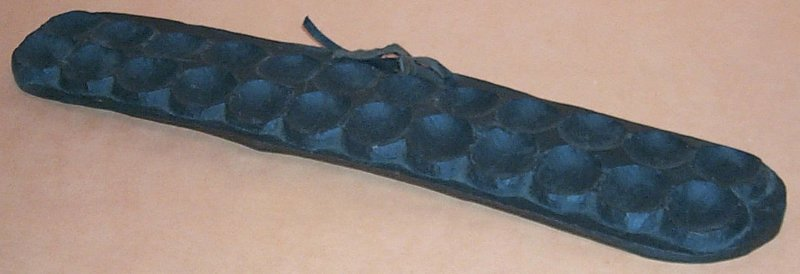
A Maasai mancala board for Enkeshui or Endodoi

Enkeshui (or Engesho) is a traditional mancala game played by the Maasai of both Kenya and Tanzania. It is a rather complex mancala game, and bears some similarities to the Layli Goobalay mancala played in Somaliland.

== Rules ==
=== Equipment and gamesetup ===
Enkeshui can be played using a mancala board of different sizes, as long as it has two rows of pits (i.e., it is a "Mancala II" game). The number of pits in each row may vary; it is usually 8, 10, or 12. 48 seeds are used. As with many traditional mancala games, it is unclear whether the initial setup is fixed or if it may be chosen by agreement between the players. Anyway, some of the most typical setups for 2x12 and 2x18 boards are like this:

3 3 0 3 3 0 3 3 0 3 3 0
0 3 3 0 3 3 0 3 3 0 3 3

4 4 4 4 4 4 0 0
0 0 4 4 4 4 4 4

0 0 4 4 4 4 4 4
4 4 4 4 4 4 0 0

=== Initial race ===
To choose which player will move first, an initial "sowing race" takes place. Both players take all the seeds from one of their pits and relay-sow them concurrently. The first player who finishes sowing will be the first to play in the remainder of the game. Notice that since the initial race is concurrent, its outcome is quite unpredictable. Thus, each game will actually begin (after the race) with a different initial setup.

=== General play ===
After the initial race, players will take turns. At his turn, the player takes all the seeds from one of his pits and sows them counterclockwise. Depending on where the last seed of the sowing is dropped, the following rules may apply:

- if the last seed is dropped in one of the opponent's pits, and this pit is empty, the turn is over;
- if the last seed is dropped in a non-empty pit, the sowing will generally go on in a relay-sowing style, with some exceptions related to the "bulls" (see below). If the initial sowing causes a relay sowing, the player will not be able to capture (see below) for the remainder of the turn.
- if the last seed is dropped in an empty pit of the player's row, and the opposite pit is non-empty all seeds in this pit are captured as well as the seed that caused the capture; all captured seeds are removed from the game. Also, if the pit where the last seed was dropped is followed (counterclockwise) by a line of empty pits, each facing a non-empty pit in the opponent's row, then all the seeds in those opponent's pits are captured as well.
- if the last seed is dropped in an empty pit of the player's row, and the opposite pit is empty, the turn is over.

A couple of additional rules also apply:

- if in an individual (not a relay) sowing the player moves across all of the opponent's row (i.e., drops a seed in each of the opponent's pits), he gains the right to choose whether any further relay-sowing will be done clockwise instead of counterclockwise; this privilege only lasts until the player's move is finished;
- sometimes, a player may be allowed to make a "special" move that consists of taking all the seeds from two of his pits and distributing them freely in his row. This will not cause or imply any sowing.

=== Bulls ===
Some pits may become "bulls". If the last seed of sowing is dropped in a pit holding 3 seeds, the pit becomes a "bull" belonging to this player. Also, if the last two seeds in sowing are dropped in two pits that hold 2 and 3 seeds, or 3 and 2 seeds, both pits become bulls of this player. Seeds in a bull can never be removed. Every time sowing ends up with the last seed being dropped in a bull, the player's turn is over. Every time sowing ends up in such a way to cause capture (see above), but the seeds that should be captured are in a bull, the capture does not take place and the turn is over.

=== End of the game ===
The game ends when one of the players cannot move anymore, because he has no seeds in his row or because he only has seeds in bull pits. The opponent then captures all the seeds in his row, except for those in bull pits; seeds in bull pits will be captured by the player owning the bull. The player who captured most seeds wins the game.

== Enkeshui in Maasai culture ==
There are several symbolic elements in Enkeshui rules. The total number of seeds, "48" (the number of seeds), is considered of good auspice in Maasai culture. The number of pits per row is always even; this is related to the fact that even numbers are considered "feminine". Most of the game's terminology is based on metaphors that are related to cattle farming: seeds are cows, pits are enclosures, and some pits are "bulls". Note that the same cattle-based metaphors are used for mancalas found in completely unrelated (but also pastoral) cultures, such as the Mongolian game Unee tugaluulax.

Enkeshui games are social events in Maasai's villages. Usually, the game is played by teams; while an individual player must be selected from each team to actually move, the team maintains the right to deny its support to this player (and replace him) and even withdraw his move if there is no consensus over it. Since the rules are quite complex, and Maasais usually play as fast as possible, illegal moves may occur either as a result of a player's mistake or his actual intent to cheat; in either case, it is the opponents' responsibility to detect the illegal move and withdraw it. Non-playing people may also intervene, and often bet on the winner. The system of social rules defining "good manners" in relation to Enkeshui (both for players and observers) is quite complex and difficult to grasp for young people as well as strangers.

== See also ==
- Endodoi
