= Ünee tugalluulakh =

Mongolian mancala game

- Ranks: Two
- Sowing: Single lap
- Region: Mongolia

Ünee tugalluulakh (Mongolian: Үнээ тугаллуулах, let the cows calve) is a mancala game played by Kazakhs in western Mongolia. The rules are the same as the iesön khorgol game.

The starting position is a 3x2 grid of holes with six pieces in each hole, as follows:

6	6	6
6	6	6
