= Aw-li On-nam Ot-tjin =

Aw-li On-nam Ot-tjin (or simply Otjin) is a traditional mancala game played by the Penihing people of Borneo. The first transcription of the rules of the game was completed by Norwegian ethnographist Carl Sofus Lumholtz. Despite its origin, Otjin is similar to African mancalas such as Ba-awa (Ghana) and quite different than most Asian mancalas.

== Rules ==
The Otjin board comprises two rows of 10 holes each. Each player owns a row of holes. Upon the game setup, each of smaller holes holds an equal number of seeds, usually 3 (but 2 to 5 are admissible).

On their turn, the player takes all the seeds from one of their holes and relay sows them counterclockwise. If the last seed is sown in a hole such that, after sowing, the number of seeds in the hole is equal to the number of seeds per hole at the beginning of the game (e.g., 3), the player captures those seeds and removes them from the game. Capture is traditionally called "fishing".

When one of the players cannot play anymore, their opponent captures all the seeds that are left on the board, and the game ends. The winner of the game is the player who captured the most seeds.
