= La'b Hakimi =

- Ranks: Two
- Sowing: Multilap
- Region: Syria

La'b Hakimi (Rational game), also known as La'b Akili (Intelligent Game), is a mancala game played in Syria.

== Rules ==
The game has the same rules as La'b Madjnuni (Crazy Game) except the following:

- At the beginning of the game, seven pieces are placed in each house
- Each player may choose one of the seven houses under their control, instead of first taking from the house on their right.
