= Mangala (game) =

Traditional Turkish mancala game

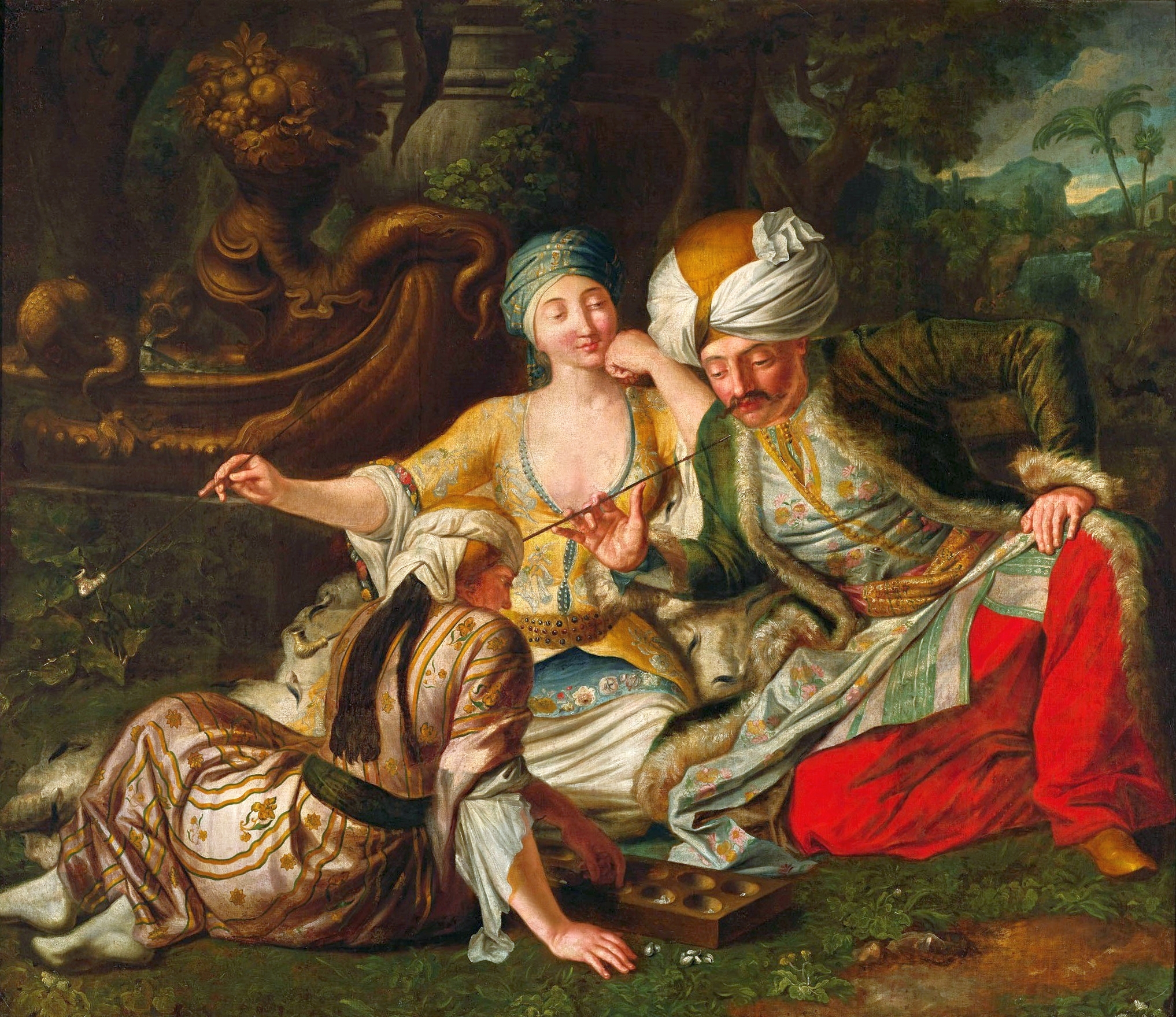
- Johann Samuel Mock, Mangala Game, 1730–1735. National Museum in Warsaw
- Ranks: Two
- Sowing: Single lap
- Region: Turkey

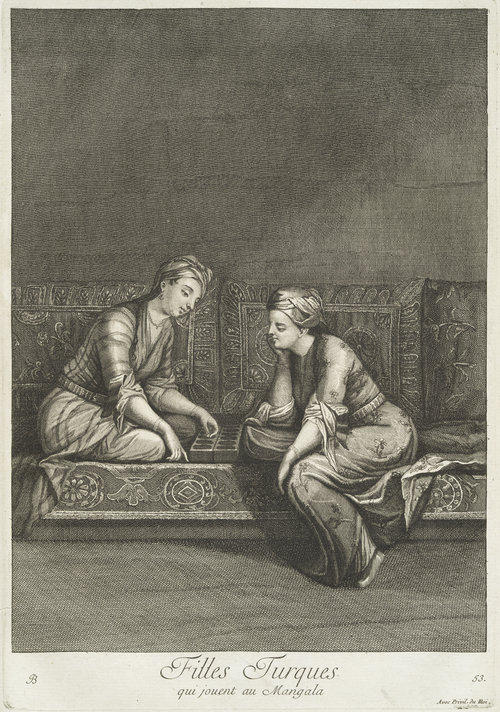
Two Turkish girls playing mangala, 1700s

Mangala is a traditional Turkish mancala game. It is strictly related to the mancala games Iraqi Halusa, Palestinian Al-manqala, and Baltic German Bohnenspiel. There is also another game referred as Mangala played by the Bedouin in Egypt, and Sudan, but it has quite different rules.

The game can be traced in Ottoman miniatures starting from the 16th century. According to the Turkish ethnologue Metin And, the "mancala" of The Arabian Nights (fifteenth night) could be directly related to this game. It was first described in 1694 by British orientalist Thomas Hyde. The game was also referred as Mangola in some later western works.

The classic mangala game is still known in Turkey, but mangala played in Gaziantep, in Southern Anatolia, is more similar to Syrian mancala La'b Madjnuni (Crazy Game). There are many other mancala variants played in Anatolia: Pıç in Erzurum, Altıev in Safranbolu, Meneli Taş in Ilgın, etc.

== Rules ==
Mangala is played on a 2x6 (or 2x7) mancala board (i.e., 2 rows of 6 or 7 pits). At game setup, 4 pieces are placed in each pit. At their turn, the player takes all the pieces from one of their pits and drops them one at a time into the following pits counterclockwise. If the last piece in a distribution is dropped in a pit that contains 1 or 3 pieces (2 or 4 with the one just dropped), all those pieces are captured by the player. Also, if there is a continuous line of pits with either 2 or 4 pieces before the one where the capture has occurred, all the seeds in those pits are captured as well. Players may capture on either side of the board. The game ends when all the pits are empty. The player who captured most pieces wins the game.
