= Nsolo =

Board game

Nsolo also called Chisolo is the Zambian version of mancala. Nsolo game is usually played by scooping holes in the ground and using small stones or Mongongo nuts for playing pieces. Two players scoop four rows of holes in the ground and begin to play, usually with the help of a number of bystanders. However, carved wooden game boards exist from earlier years and can also still be bought at tourist markets in Livingstone and Lusaka. Several variations of the game exist.
