= El Arnab =

Traditional Arab solitaire

El Arnab is a traditional Arab solitaire based on the general equipment and gameplay of mancala games. It is played by the Kababish people of Sudan. The name "El Arnab" means "the rabbit".

== Rules ==
El Arnab's board is a mancala board comprising 2 rows of 3 pits each, with an additional larger pits ("stores") located at each end of the board. The game setup is as follows:

- 3 seeds in the lefthand store;
- 1 seed in the righthand store;
- 2 seeds in each of the four pits at the extremes of the rows;
- 1 seed in each of the remaining pits.

3 | 2 1 2 |
| - - - |
| 2 1 2 | 1

To begin the game, the player takes all the seeds from the pit at the upper left corner of the rows, and relay-sows them counterclockwise. Sowing also includes the stores.

This relay sowing (and thus the game itself) never ends; it is meant to be just a pastime. It happens that every 27 circuits of the board, the board goes back to its initial setup.

In his 1925 article R. Davies stated that the pattern repeats every 26 circuits; but he miscounted. His informant, an elderly Arab, seems to have been aware of this; when Davies said he counted 26 the informant made a joke that apparently went over Davies' head ('Ah, a skilled player could do it in less.').
