= Giuthi =

Kenyan game

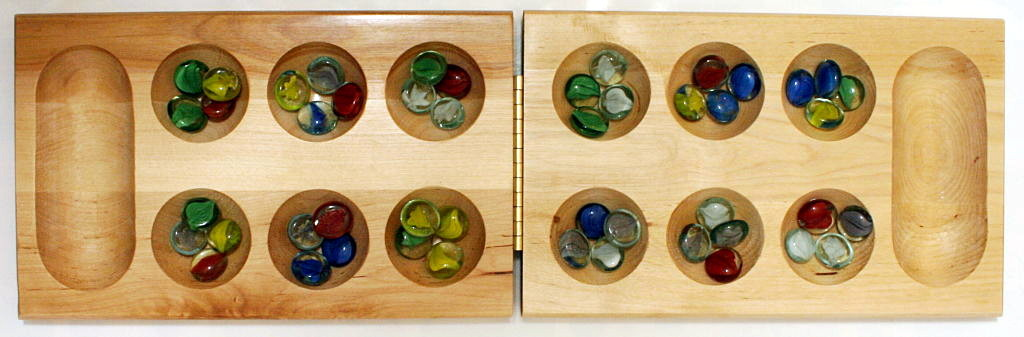
A wooden mandala board

Giuthi is a game played by the Kikuyu, Embu of Kenya, amongst others. It belongs to the Mancala family of games and is "played with round counters, such as beans, and two rows of holes in the ground".
