= Das Bohnenspiel =

German mancala game

- Ranks: Two
- Sowing: Single lap
- Region: Germany

Bohnenspiel ("the bean game") is a German mancala game described in the 1937 Deutsche Spielhandbuch.

== Rules ==
Store (0)	6	6	6	6	6	6	Store (0)
Store (0)	6	6	6	6	6	6	Store (0)

Starting position for Das Bohnenspiel

The field consists of two rows of six pits each. The game starts with six beans in each pit.

Each player "owns" the six pits closest to himself. The player whose turn it is to play chooses any one of his pits which contains at least one bean. He removes all the beans from this pit and sows them counterclockwise. Sowing is accomplished by selecting a pit, removing all the pieces from that pit, and dropping them one by one in each subsequent pit (leaving out the stores), until all have been used.

If the last bean ends up in a pit which, after sowing, contains exactly two, four, or six beans (but no other number), all beans in this pit are captured. If any capture is made, the preceding pit is checked (and its beans possibly captured) according to the same rule, and so forth.

If the player whose turn it is to move cannot move, the game ends and all beans on the board go to the other player.

The goal is to capture more beans than the opponent.

== History ==
The Bohnenspiel was first mentioned by Fritz Jahn his book Old German Games (1917). In it he describes a 1908 trip to Estonia to visit Baron von Stackelberg. There he discovered a replica of a game board which to this day is kept in the Hermitage Museum in St. Petersburg. The original board had been a gift from the Shah of Persia to Empress Catherine the Great.

The game spread in German-Baltic and Prussian noble families until it was popularized by Jahn in the entire German-speaking world and in all population strata. Jahn also pursued adult-pedagogical goals with the game: He wanted to educate the working class and improve the lives of wounded German World War I veterans. His variant of the game is also called Baltic bean game, while another variant, which used a bigger board, is called German bean game.

A detailed analysis of the rules of the game shows the bean game to be very similar to Central Asian and Arab mancala games, such as Turkish mangala, Palestinian Al-manqala, and Iraqi Halusa. This fits very well with the likely origin of the game. The resemblance to African mancala games on the other hand is probably coincidence.

In the 19th century, the game was most popular in the Baltic States, East and West Prussia and Pomerania. In the Baltics, the game disappeared after the October Revolution, due to the expropriation, expulsion, and execution of the German noble families in 1917. In East Germany, several books were written about the game. Plastic game boards were made in the 1980s, with the name of the game changed to Sabo or Badari.
