= Ô ăn quan =

Vietnamese board game

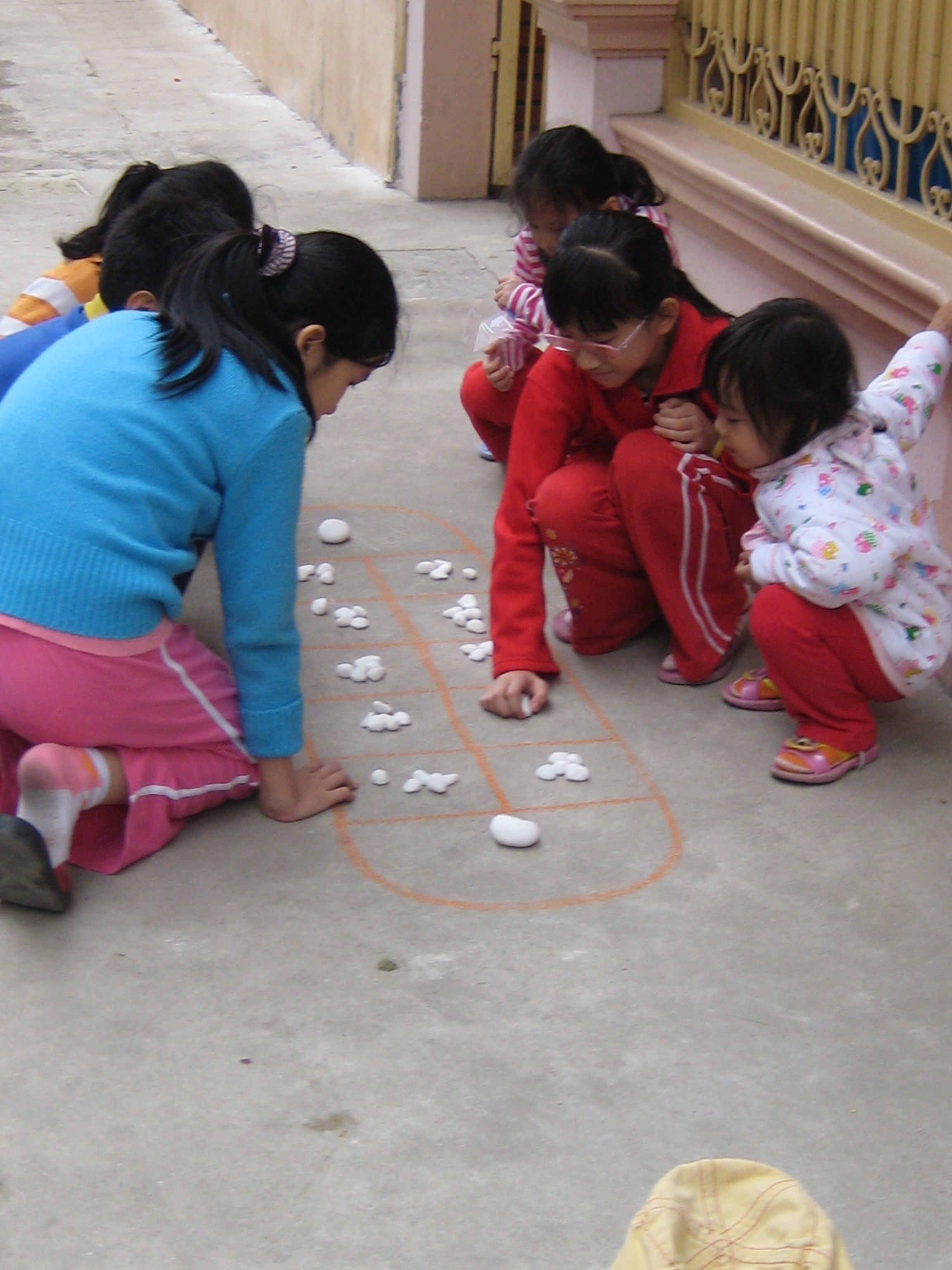
Vietnamese children play "Ô ăn quan"

"Ô ăn quan" board

Ô ăn quan (Vietnamese Traditional Stone Game, Quan Capture Game, or Vietnamese Mancala) is a traditional Vietnamese children's board game. This game is valuable for enhancing calculating and strategic ability.

== Board, pieces, and players ==
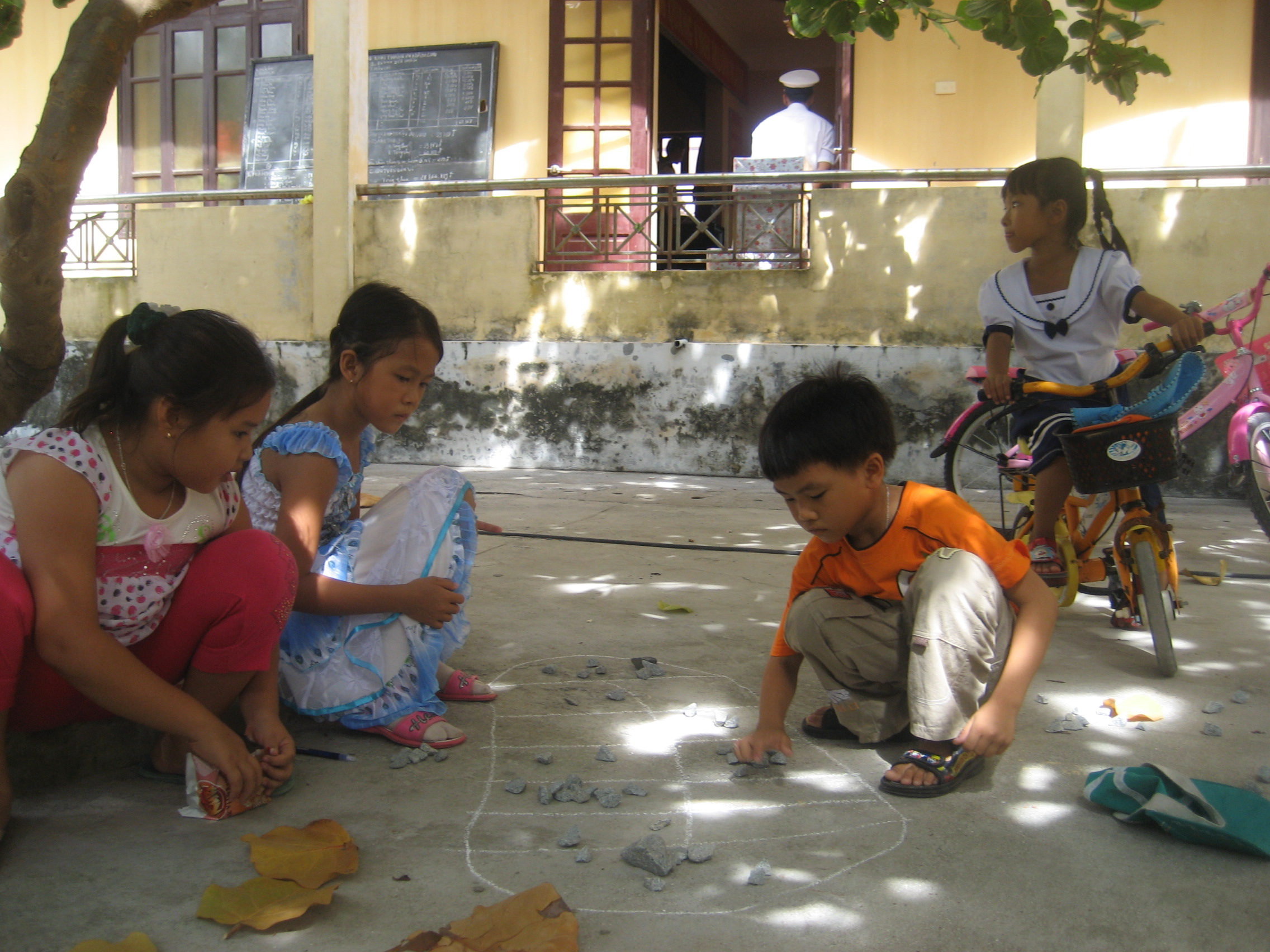
Children play Ô ăn quan in Trường Sa

- A rectangle which is divided into ten squares (5x2) with two semicircles at each end is drawn on the floor or the yard. The ten squares are called "rice field square", "fish pond square" or "citizen square" and the two semicircles are called "Mandarin squares".
- Pieces may be stones, fruit seeds or any other small things.
- Two players or two teams sit in two sides of the board. Each controls one side of the board.

== History ==
The game's origin is unknown, as it has been played for many years. Many people say that Vietnamese ancestors were inspired by green rice fields to invent a game that could be played in those huge fields. At first, the game had become quite popular throughout the country. However, as time passed Vietnamese children no longer had the same passion for the game like those in the past. For this reason, the Vietnam Museum of Ethnology is exhibiting the game with fully explained instructions with the aim of keeping the game alive among children nowadays.

According to many researchers, Ô Ăn Quan belongs to the Mancala family of games that has its origin rooted in Naqala (means movement). Through time, this game got popularized to other countries through culture and religion.

== Rules ==
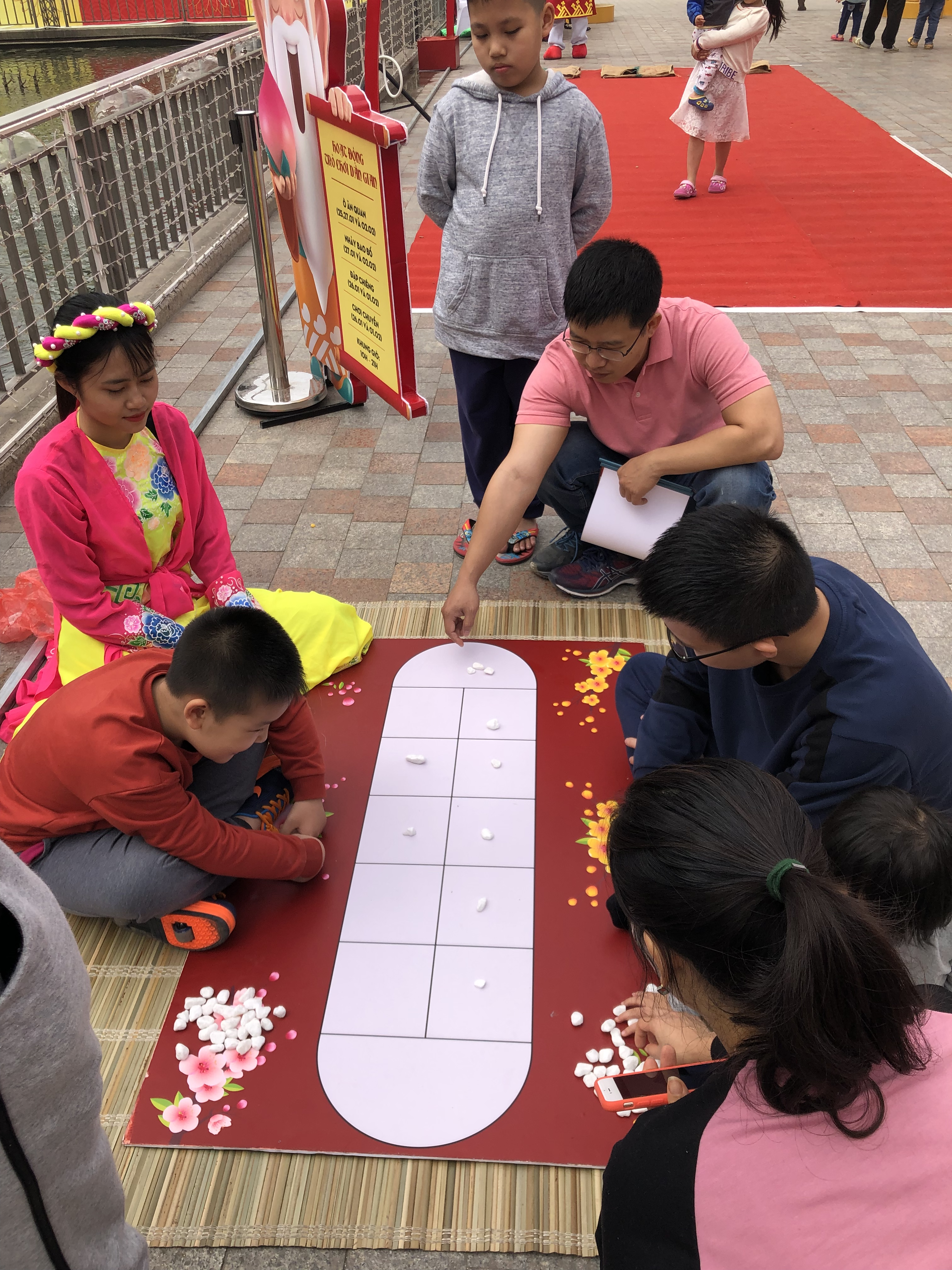
Play Ô ăn quan on New Year's Day at Vinhomes Times City

=== Setup ===
Each player places one big stone or ten small stones (called the "Mandarin piece") in the Mandarin square as well as five small stones (called "citizen pieces") in each of the rice field squares.

=== Objective ===
The game ends when all the pieces are captured.

If both Mandarin pieces are captured, the remaining citizen pieces belong to the player controlling the side that these pieces are on. There is a Vietnamese saying to express this situation: "hết quan, tàn dân, thu quân, bán ruộng" (literally: "Mandarin is gone, citizen dismisses, take back the army, selling the rice field") or "hết quan, tàn dân, thu quân, kéo về" (literally: "Mandarin is gone, citizen dismisses, take back the army, retreat")

Whichever player has more pieces is the winner (a Mandarin piece is equal to ten or five citizen pieces).

=== Scattering ===
Players play rock paper scissors to determine the first player.

The first player takes up all the pieces of any rice field square on their side of the board and distributes (Vietnamese: rải: literally: scatter) one piece per square, starting at the next square in either direction. When all pieces are distributed, the player repeats by taking up the pieces of the following square and distributing them.

If their side of the board is empty, they must use five previously won pieces to place one piece in each square on their side before repeating the distribution. (If they do not possess any pieces, they must borrow a piece from the other player and return it when counting the points at the end of the game.)

=== Capturing ===
When the next square to be distributed is empty, the player wins all the pieces in the square after that. A square that contains a lot of pieces is the nhà giàu square (literally: rich square).

When the next square is an empty Mandarin square, or the next two squares are empty, it becomes the other player's turn.

In some game variations, the Mandarin square can contain little citizen pieces called quan non (literally - quan: Mandarin; non: young or unripened) which may not be captured.

== Song ==
The children song (Vietnamese: đồng dao) is used when playing this game:

Hàng trầu hàng cau The betel stall, the areca nut stall
Là hàng con gái Be stalls of girls
Hàng bánh hàng trái The cake stall, the fruit stall
Là hàng bà già Be stalls of old women
Hàng hương hàng hoa The incense stall, the flower stall
Là hàng cúng Phật. Be stalls for offering the Buddha.

== In science ==
- Mạc Hiển Tích invented số ẩn (negative numbers) from the rules of this game.

== In literature ==
- Saying: "Một đập ăn quan" - literally: "one move captures Mandarin piece": expressing a successful result getting from a simple act.

== Variant ==
A variation of this game exists for two, three and four players.

== See also ==
- List of Vietnamese traditional games
