= Endodoi =

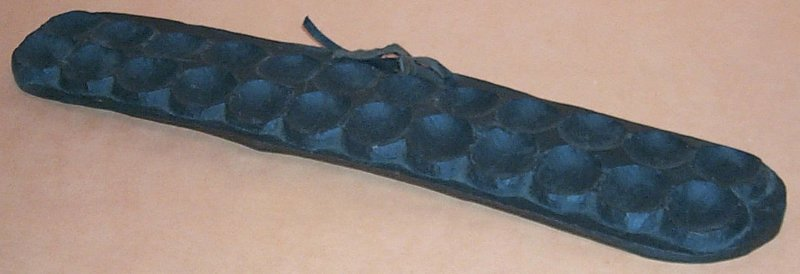
An Endodoi 2x12 board

Endodoi is a traditional mancala game played by the Maasai people of Kenya and Tanzania. It is very close to the Ayoayo game of the Yoruba people of Nigeria, although there is no evidence of a direct relationship between the two. Maasai are known to play Endodoi very quickly, to the point that an external observer may find it hard to even distinguish individual moves and turns.

== Rules ==
Endodoi is played on a board with two rows of holes, but the number of holes per row may vary. A common number is 12. The number of seeds used in the game is also variable; usually, the initial game setup has somewhere from 3 to 6 seeds per hole.

On their turn, each player (the game is two-player) takes all seeds from one of their holes and relay-sows them counterclockwise. When the last seed is sown in an empty hole, and if this hole belongs to the player whose turn it is, he or she will capture this seed as well as any seed in the opposing hole.

When one of the players cannot move anymore, the game is over. The opponent captures all the seeds that are left on the board and the winner is the player who captured the most seeds.

== See also ==
Enkeshui
