= Toguz korgool =

Game

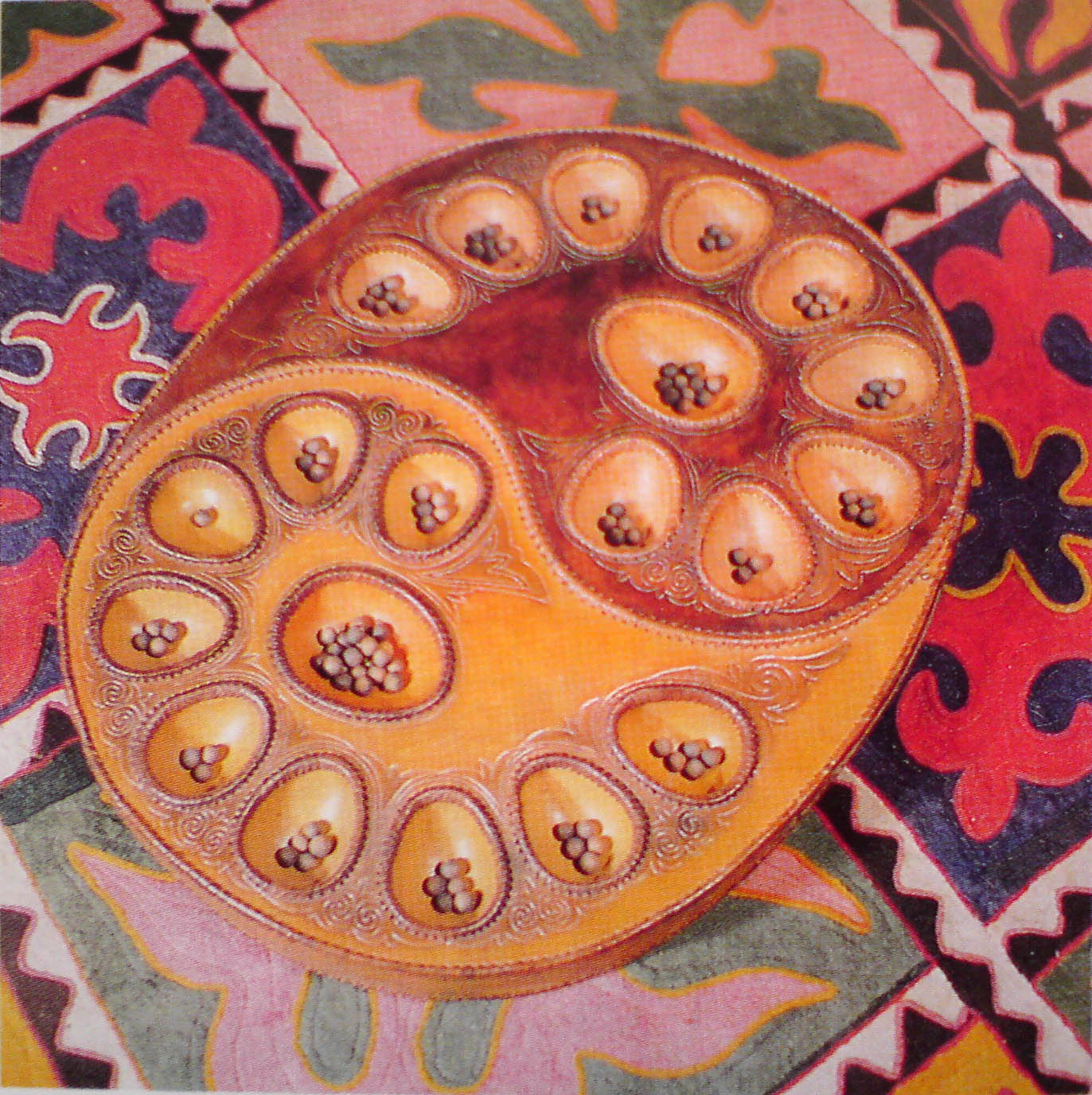
Souvenir wood board for Toguz korgool game

Toguz korgool (Kyrgyz: тогуз коргоол – "nine sheep droppings") is a Kyrgyz game in the mancala family. Toguz korgool differs in that when capturing stones from a hole, one stone remains.

== Board ==
The game is played on a board with two rows of nine holes. There are two "kazans" ("cauldron" in Kyrgyz) between these rows, which are used to collect captured stones of each user, separately. At the beginning there are nine stones in each hole, except the kazans, which are empty, so players need a total of 162 stones.

== Game start ==
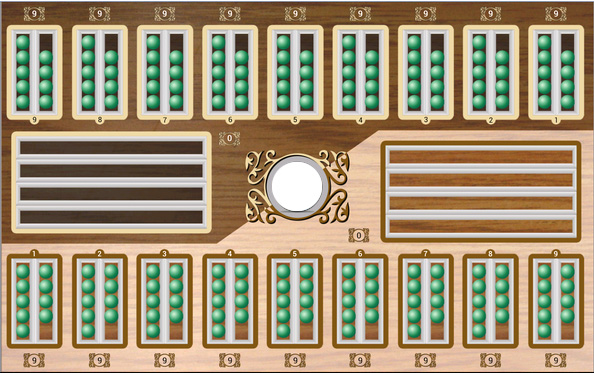
Starting position

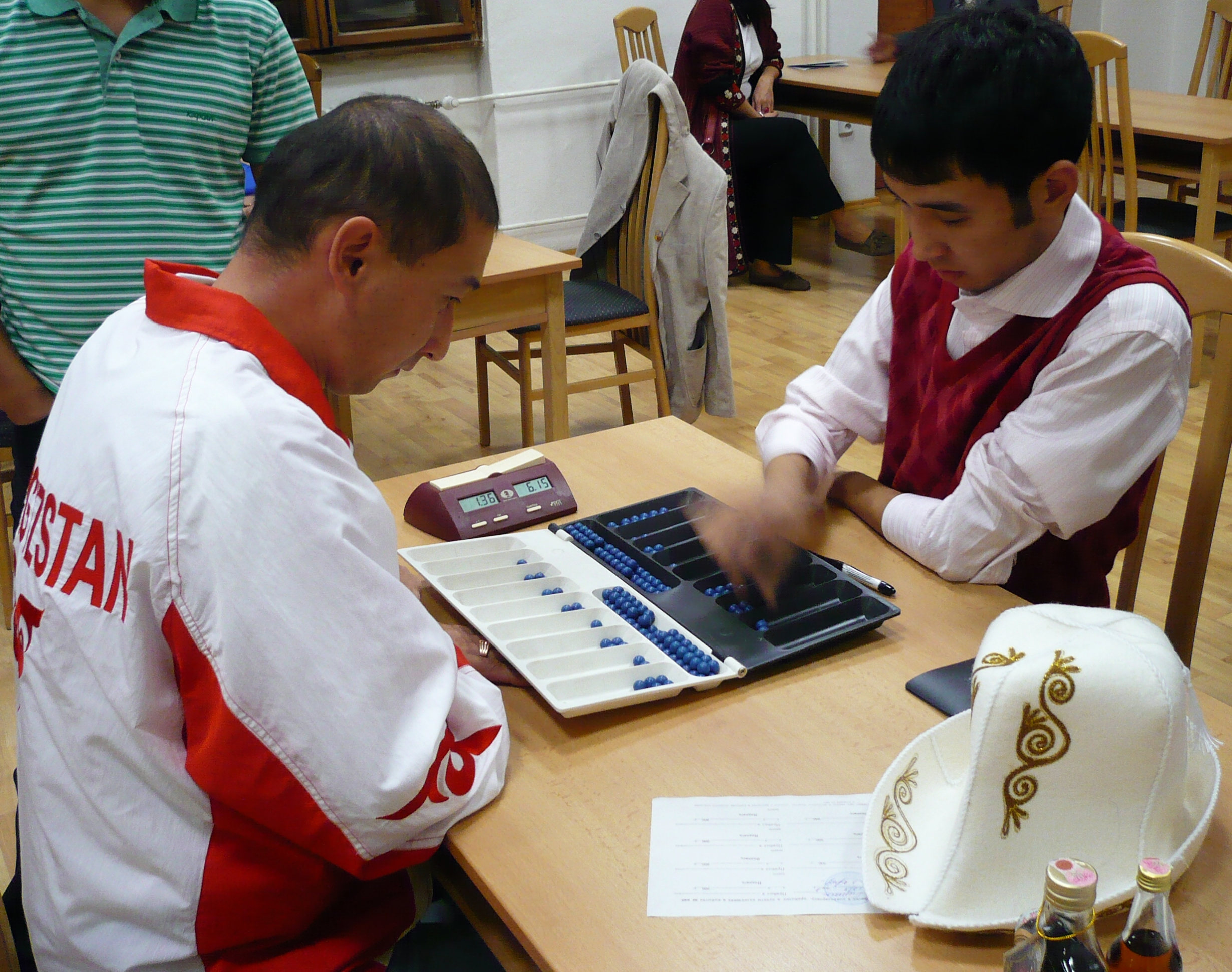
"Black" moves.

The board sides are labeled as black and white. The player sitting on the white side starts the game.

== Game play ==
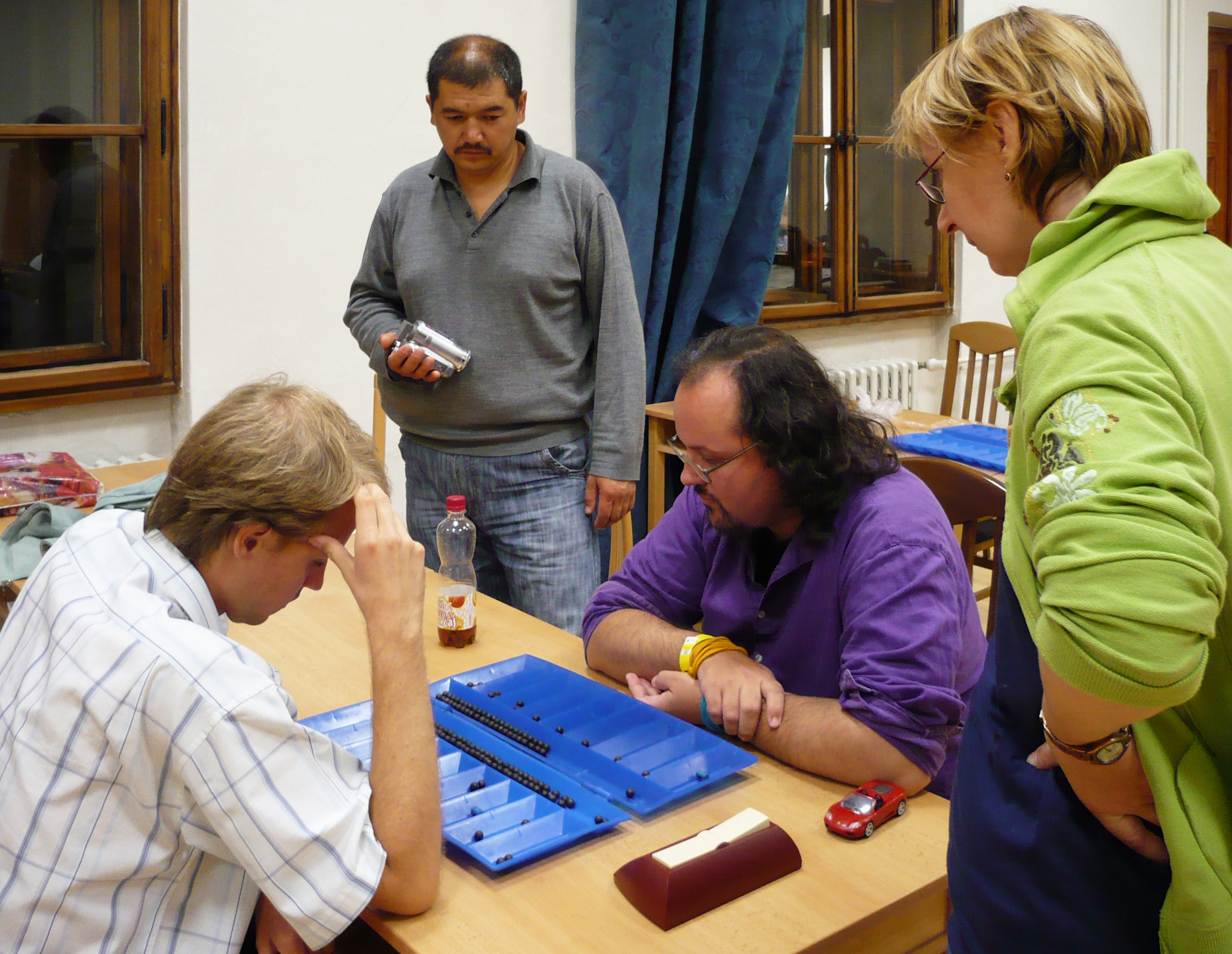
Playing toguz korgool

Players move alternately. A move consists of taking stones from a hole and distributing them to other holes. On his/her turn, a player takes all the stones of one of his holes, which is not a tuz (see below), and distributes them anticlockwise, one by one, into the following holes. The first stone must be dropped into the hole which was just emptied. However, if the move began from a hole which contained only one stone, this stone is put into the next hole.

If the last stone falls into a hole on the opponent's side, and this hole then contains an even number of stones, these stones are captured and stored in the player's kazan. If the last stone falls into a hole of the opponent, which then has three stones, the hole is marked as a "tuz" ("salt" in Kyrgyz). There are a few restrictions on creating a tuz:

1. A player may create only one tuz in each game.
2. The last hole of the opponent (his ninth or rightmost hole) cannot be turned into a tuz.
3. A tuz cannot be made if it is symmetrical to the opponent's one (for instance, if the opponent's third hole is a tuz, you cannot turn your third hole into one). It is permitted to make such a move, but it wouldn't create a tuz.

The stones that fall into a tuz are captured by its owner. He may transfer its contents at any time to his kazan. The game ends when a player can't move at his turn because all the holes on his side, which are not tuz, are empty.

When the game is over, the remaining stones which are not yet in a kazan or in a tuz are won by the player on whose side they are. The winner is the player who, at the end of the game, has captured more stones in their tuz and their kazan. When each player has 81 stones, the game is a draw.

== Competitions ==
The Toguz Korgool Federation was found in Bishkek in 1993. The Togyz korgool World Championships are held every two years. There are many competitions on local, regional and national levels in Central Asia. In addition, there are annual tournaments in some European countries, including England (London), Germany (Schweinfurt), Switzerland (La Tour-de-Peilz), and the Czech Republic (Prague and Pardubice). Toguz korgool is also included in the program of the World Nomad Games.
