= Ayoayo =

Traditional mancala played by the Yoruba people in Nigeria

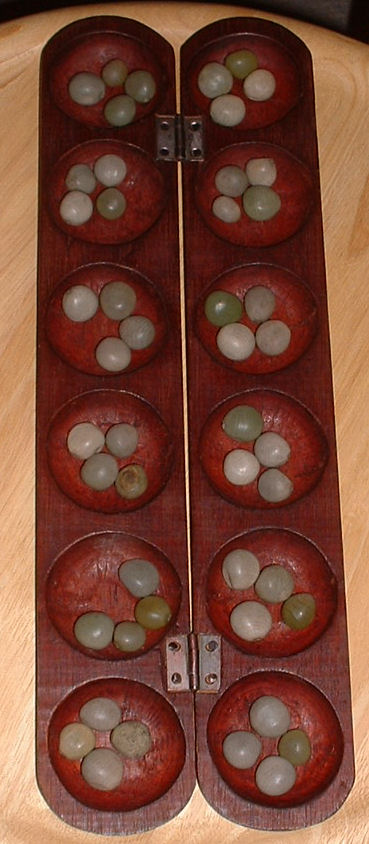
Equipment and initial setup of the Ayo game

Ayo (Yoruba: Ayò Ọlọ́pọ́n) is a traditional mancala played by the Yoruba people in Nigeria. It is very close to the Oware game that spread to the Americas with the Atlantic slave trade. Among modern mancalas, which are most often derived from Warri, the Kalah is a notable one that has essentially the same rules as Ayo.

There are games with identical rules also in other areas of Africa. One such game is Endodoi, played by the Maasai people of Kenya and Tanzania.

== Rules ==
The Ayoayo (Ayo) board comprises two rows of six holes each, and 48 seeds are used; at the beginning, 4 seeds are placed in each hole. These are exactly the same equipment and setup as those of Awari and many other 2-row mancalas such as Layli Goobalay. Each player owns one of the rows.

Each turn the player takes all seeds from one of the holes and relay sows them counterclockwise. During each individual sowing, the starting hole is skipped (i.e., no seeds are dropped there even if more than 12 seeds are to be sown). When the last seed is sown in an empty hole, the player captures any seen in the opposing hole if this hole belongs to the player.

When one of the players cannot move anymore, the game is over. The opponent captures all the seeds that are left on the board and the winner is the player who captured most seeds.

If a turn ends with no seeds left in their row, the opponent must (if it is possible) choose their move in such a way as to bring one or more seeds into the other's row. This scheme is found in many mancalas and is sometimes referred to as "feeding" the opponent (i.e., saving the opponent from starving).
