= Layli Goobalay =

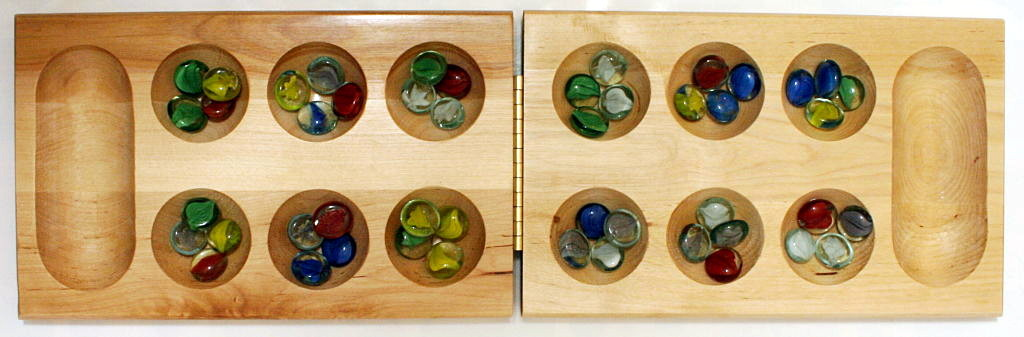
A wooden mancala board.

Layli Goobalay (or Layli Goobaly) is a board game played in parts of Somalia. It is a variant of the classical count and capture game mancala (from the Arabic word naqala, meaning literally "to move"), which is one of the oldest two-player strategy board games played throughout the world. Layli Goobalay means "to exercise with circles" in the Somali language.

== Rules ==
Layli Goobalay is played on a 2x6 mancala board (i.e., 2 rows of 6 pits each), with 48 seeds. At game setup, 4 seeds are placed in each pit. Similar equipment and game setup are used for in other mancalas.

At his or her turn, the player takes all the seeds from a pit and sows them counterclockwise. If the last seed of a sowing falls in a non-empty pit that is not a Uur (see below), relay-sowing applies. Thus, the player's turn ends when the last seed in a sowing is dropped in an empty pit or in a Uur pit. Depending on the pit where this last seed was dropped, the following situations may occur:

- if the pit is a Uur, nothing happens;
- if the pit is in the opponent's row, nothing happens;
- if the pit is the player's row, and the adjacent pit in the opponent's row is empty, nothing happens;
- if the pit is the player's row, and the adjacent pit in the opponent's row is non empty, the seeds in the opponent's pit are captured. This in turn may lead to two consequences:
  - if the opponent's pit contains 3 seeds, one of those seeds is captured and placed in the same pit as the capturing seed. The two pits involved in the capture thus will have 2 seeds each. Those are termed Uur (meaning "pregnant") and they now belong to the player who captured;
  - if the opponent's pit contains any other number of seeds, all those seeds as well as the capturing seed are removed from the game.

A player can never begin a sowing from Uur pits, and relay-sowing does not apply to Uur pits. Consequently, the content of Uur pits tends to grow over time.

The game ends when one of the player can no longer move. Both players then capture the seeds from their own Uurs (remember that a player can own a Uur in the opponent's row) and from the other pits in their own rows. The player who captured most seeds wins the game.
