= Oware =

Ghanaian abstract strategy game

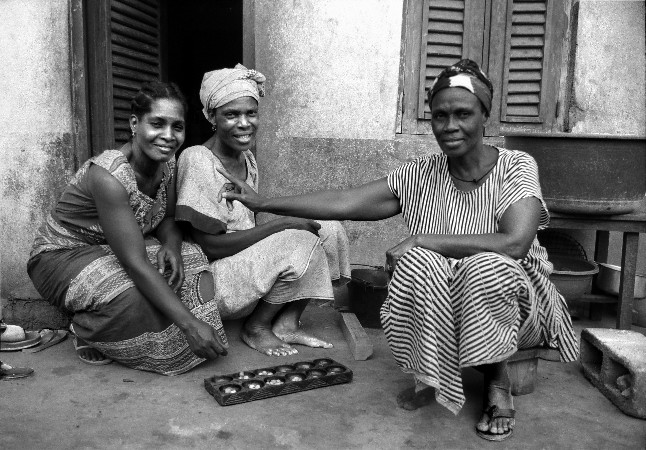
A game of awale

Oware is an abstract strategy game among the mancala family of board games (pit and pebble games) played worldwide with slight variations as to the layout of the game, number of players and strategy of play. Its origin is uncertain, but it is widely believed to be of Ashanti origin.

Played in the Bono Region, Bono East Region, Ahafo Region, Central Region, Western Region, Eastern Region, and Ashanti Region of Ghana as well as throughout the Caribbean, oware and its variants have many names - ayò, ayoayo (Yoruba), awalé (Ivory Coast, Benin), wari (Mali), ouri, ouril or uril (Cape Verde), warri (Caribbean), wali (Dagbani), adji (Ewe), nchọ/ókwè (Igbo), ise (Edo), awale (Ga) (meaning "spoons" in English). A common name in English is awari but one of the earliest Western scholars to study the game, Robert Sutherland Rattray, used the name wari.

== Rules ==
The following are the rules for the abapa variation, considered to be the most appropriate for serious, adult play.

=== Equipment ===
The game requires an oware board and 48 seeds. A typical oware board has two straight rows of six pits, called "houses", and optionally one large "score" house at each end. Each player controls the six houses on their side of the board, and the score house on their end. The game begins with four seeds in each of the twelve smaller houses.

Store (0)	4	4	4	4	4	4	Store (0)
Store (0)	4	4	4	4	4	4	Store (0)

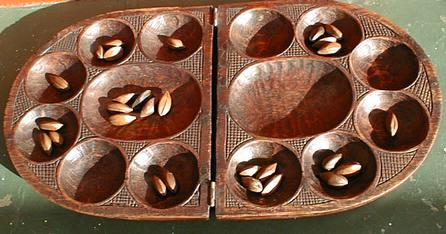
Oware game variant. On this board players would sit left and right.

Boards may be elaborately carved or simple and functional; they may include a pedestal, or be hinged to fold lengthwise or crosswise and latch for portability and storage with the seeds inside. While most commonly located at either end, scoring houses may be placed elsewhere, and the rows do not need to be straight. When a board has a hinged cover like a diptych, the scoring houses may be carved into the two halves of the cover, and so be in front of the players during play. The ground may also be used as a board; players simply scoop two rows of pits out of the earth.

In the Caribbean, the seeds are typically nickernuts, which are smooth and shiny. Beads and pebbles are also sometimes used. In the West, some cheaper sets use oval-shaped marbles. Some tourist sets use cowrie shells.

=== Objective ===
The game starts with four seeds in each house. The objective of the game is to capture more seeds than one's opponent. Since the game has only 48 seeds, capturing 25 is sufficient to win the game. Since there is an even number of seeds, it is possible for the game to end in a draw, where each player has captured 24.

=== Sowing ===
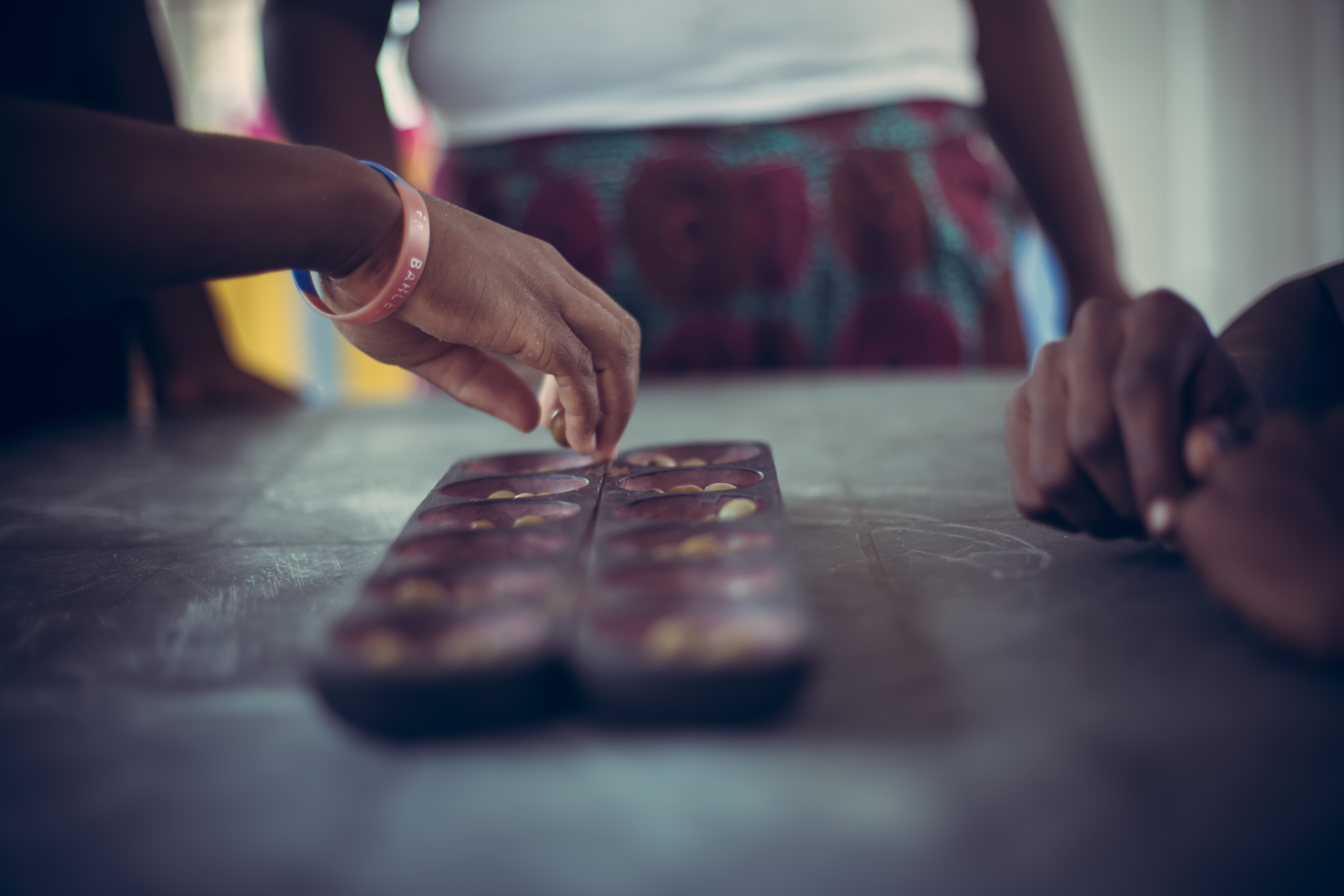
A player sowing seeds

Players take turns moving the seeds. On a turn, a player chooses one of the six houses under their control. The player removes all seeds from that house, and distributes them, dropping one in each house counter-clockwise from this house, in a process called sowing. Seeds are not distributed into the end scoring houses, nor into the house drawn from. The starting house is always left empty; if it contained 12 (or more) seeds, it is skipped, and the twelfth seed is placed in the next house. The diagram shows the result of sowing from house E.

Example turn:

2	2	1	2	3	1
3	1	4	Empty	6 (highlighted)	2
A	B	C	D	E	F

The lower player prepares to sow from E.

f	e	d	c	b	a
2	3 (highlighted)	2 (highlighted)	3 (highlighted)	4	2
3	1	4	Empty	Empty	3

After sowing, e, d, and c are captured but not a.

Knowing the number of seeds in each house is, of course, important to game play. When there are many seeds in a house, sometimes enough to make a full lap of the board or more, they cannot easily be counted by eye, and their number is often guarded by the player who controls that house. This may be done by repeatedly moving the seeds in the house. A player may count the seeds when contemplating a move; in such cases the last few are usually counted in the hand to avoid revealing their number.

=== Capturing ===
In Oware Abapa, capturing occurs only when a player brings the count of an opponent's house to exactly two or three with the final seed they sowed in that turn. This always captures the seeds in the corresponding house, and possibly more: If the previous-to-last seed also brought an opponent's house to two or three, these are captured as well, and so on until a house is reached which does not contain two or three seeds or does not belong to the opponent. The captured seeds are placed in the player's scoring house (or set aside if the board has no scoring houses). However, if a move would capture all of an opponent's seeds, the capture is forfeited since this would prevent the opponent from continuing the game, and the seeds are instead left on the board. (However, see discussion on Grand Slam variations below). In the adjacent diagram, the lower player would capture all the seeds in houses e, d, and c but not b (as it has four seeds) or a (since it is not contiguous to the other captured houses).

=== Let the opponent play ===
The proscription against capturing all an opponent's seeds is related to a more general idea, that one ought to make a move that allows the opponent to continue playing. If an opponent's houses are all empty, the current player must make a move that gives the opponent seeds. If no such move is possible, the current player captures all seeds in their own territory, ending the game.

=== Winning ===
The game is over when one player has captured 25 or more seeds, or each player has taken 24 seeds (draw). If both players agree that the game has been reduced to an endless cycle, the game ends when each player has seeds in their holes and then each player captures the seeds on their side of the board.

== Variations ==
=== "Grand slam" variations ===
A grand slam is capturing all of an opponent's seeds in one turn. There are variations to the rule that applies, which may be one of the following:

1. Grand slam captures are not legal moves.
2. Such a move is legal, but no capture results. International competitions often follow this rule.
3. Grand slam captures are allowed, however, all remaining stones on the board are awarded to the opponent.
4. Such a move is legal, but the last (or first) house is not captured.

Various other rules also exist.

Variations allowing Grand slams to end the game are strongly solved by Henri Bal and John Romein at the Vrije Universiteit in Amsterdam in 2002; either side can force a draw.

=== Other ===
One commercial version was marketed in 1964 by 3M, as the board game Oh-Wah-Ree.

== History and society ==
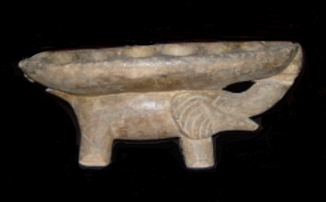
Awalé with the shape of an elephant

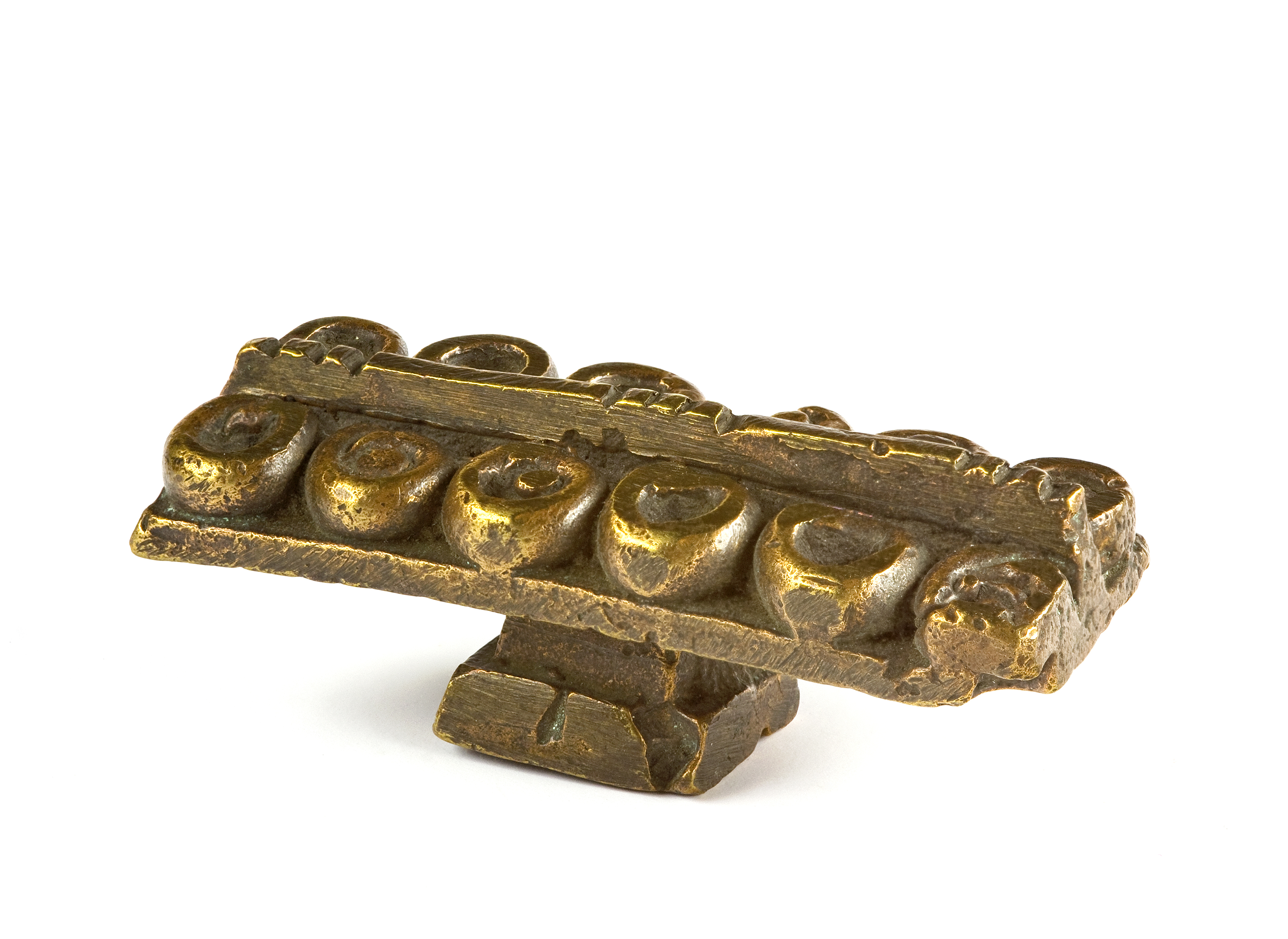
Weight for weighing gold dust – Awele or Awari game

Oware is perhaps the most widespread game in the mancala family of games.

Considered the national game of Bono State, Ashanti City-State, and Antigua & Barbuda, oware is said to derive its name — which literally means "he/she marries" — from a legend in the Akan language and Twi, the language of the Akan people, about a man and a woman who played the game endlessly and, so as to be able to stay together and continue playing, they married.

Reflecting traditional African values, players of oware encourage participation by onlookers, making it perhaps the most social two-player abstract. In recreational play, it is normal for spectators to discuss the game in progress and to advise the players. Games may provide a focus for entertainment and meeting others. The game, or variations of it, also had an important role in teaching arithmetic to African children.

== See also ==
- Pallanguzhi
- Kalah
