= Chulpan =

Chulpan (Russian: Чулпан) means morning star (i.e. Venus) in Tatar language and may refer to:

== Rural localities in Russia ==
- Chulpan 2-y, Republic of Bashkortostan
- Kyzyl-Chulpan, Republic of Bashkortostan
- Chulpan, Bizhbulyaksky District, Republic of Bashkortostan
- Chulpan, Buzdyaksky District, Republic of Bashkortostan
- Chulpan, Miyakinsky District, Republic of Bashkortostan
- Chulpan, Salavatsky District, Republic of Bashkortostan
- Chulpan, Sterlitamaksky District, Republic of Bashkortostan
- Chulpan, Tolbazinsky Selsoviet, Aurgazinsky District, Republic of Bashkortostan
- Chulpan, Urshaksky Selsoviet, Aurgazinsky District, Republic of Bashkortostan
- Chulpan, Yanaulsky District, Republic of Bashkortostan
- Chulpan, Yermekeyevsky District, Republic of Bashkortostan

== Other ==
- Chulpan Khamatova (born 1975), Russian actress of Tatar origin

== See also ==
- Cholpon (disambiguation)
