= 2026 World Nomad Games =

Multi-sport event in Kyrgyzstan

6th World Nomad Games
- Host city: Bishkek and Cholpon-Ata, Kyrgyzstan
- Edition: 6
- Nations: 100
- Athletes: Over 3000
- Events: 43 sports
- Opening: 31 August 2026
- Closing: 6 September 2026
- Opened by: President of Kyrgyzstan Sadyr Japarov

Opening ceremony, Russian delegation.

The 2026 World Nomad Games, (Note: Kyrgyz: Дүйнөлүк көчмөндөр оюндары 2026, Russian: Всемирные игры кочевников 2026) officially known as the VI World Nomad Games, (Note: Kyrgyz: VI Дүйнөлүк көчмөндөр оюндары, Russian: VI Всемирные игры кочевников) was an international multi-sport event that was held between 31 August to 6 September 2026, in two cities of Kyrgyzstan: Bishkek, where the opening and closing ceremonies took place, and Cholpon-Ata, which was the main venue for the games. It was the sixth edition of the World Nomad Games and the fourth edition to be hosted by Kyrgyzstan.

== Background ==
Cholpon-Ata is a small resort town in northern Kyrgyzstan, located on the northern shore of the famous lake Issyk-Kul, which has previously hosted the World Nomad Games three times.

The first games, held from 9 to 14 September 2014, brought together 583 athletes from 19 countries who competed in 10 sports.

Athletes from 80 countries, including those not traditionally nomadic, took part in the second games, which took place in the same place, in Cholpon-Ata, from 3 to 8 September 2016.

More than 1,500 athletes from 66 countries took part in the third games in September 2018, competing in 37 traditional sports.

The fourth games, held from 29 September to 2 October 2022 in the Turkish city of Iznik, were the first to be held outside Kyrgyzstan.

The fact that the sixth games would again be held on Kyrgyz soil became known during the closing ceremony of the fifth games, which took place from 8 to 13 September 2024, in the Kazakhstani capital, Astana, although it was initially assumed that they would be held in Uzbekistan.

== Preparation ==
On 27 September 2025, the President of Kyrgyzstan Sadyr Japarov signed a decree on the creation of an organizing committee for the preparation and holding of the VI World Nomad Games in 2026.

General management and coordination of work on preparations for the games is entrusted to the Presidential Executive Office, Kanybek Tumanbaev.

At the first meeting, held on 2 October of the same year, the composition of the organizing committee was approved, which was tasked with developing an action plan covering organizational, protocol and other preparatory aspects.

Instructions were also given to ensure security and law and order during the events, as well as to create conditions for a high level of hospitality. An important aspect of the preparation was the timely construction and modernization of the necessary infrastructure for the comfortable holding of the games.

147.5 million soms have been allocated for the preparation and holding of the competition. Most of these funds are directed toward infrastructure development and breeding, with 32.8 million soms earmarked for the latter. Another 91.2 million will be spent on technical equipment for the game venues. The remaining 23.5 million will go toward administrative costs and staffing.

The opening ceremony of the games took place at the Azattyk Arena, and the closing ceremony took place at the Cholpon-Ata hippodrome.

== Opening ceremony ==
The opening ceremony took place on 31 August 2026, at the Bishkek Arena stadium, which has a capacity of 51,000 seats and coincided with the anniversary summit of the SCO.

== Participating countries ==
The games featured athletes from over 100 countries competing in 43 sports. In total, a record number of athletes have announced their participation – around 3 thousand. The main event, Kok-Boru, was won by Kyrgyzstan 12-0 in a final against Kazakhstan.

== Medal table ==
* Host nation (Kyrgyzstan)

Rank	Nation	Gold	Silver	Bronze	Total
1	Kazakhstan	32	20	22	74
2	Kyrgyzstan*	30	31	16	77
3	Russia	7	7	19	33
4	Mongolia	4	4	18	26
5	Iran	4	3	8	15
6	Uzbekistan	3	5	12	20
7	Turkmenistan	2	3	6	11
8	Tajikistan	2	0	3	5
9	Ghana	2	0	1	3
10	Moldova	1	4	0	5
11	France	1	0	1	2
11	Hungary	1	0	1	2
13	Nigeria	1	0	0	1
13	Pakistan	1	0	0	1
13	South Korea	1	0	0	1
13	Togo	1	0	0	1
17	China	0	4	2	6
18	Georgia	0	2	1	3
19	Poland	0	1	3	4
20	Azerbaijan	0	1	2	3
21	Belarus	0	1	1	2
22	Saudi Arabia	0	1	0	1
22	United States	0	1	0	1
24	Uganda	0	0	3	3
25	Bulgaria	0	0	2	2
25	Canada	0	0	2	2
27	Japan	0	0	1	1
27	Latvia	0	0	1	1
27	Spain	0	0	1	1
27	Turkey	0	0	1	1
Totals (30 entries)		93	88	127	308

== Medalists ==
=== National games ===
Event	Gold	Silver	Bronze
Breaking the vertebral bone	Oyuundalai Tumenkhishig; Mongolia	Zurbakov Gombo; Russia	Shubaev Hamza; Kazakhstan
Ordo	Kyrgyzstan; Kylychbek Nurmatov; Nursultan Mayrambek uulu Akay Mayrambek uulu Ulan Daniyar uulu Mayrambek Kasymaliev; Attokur Azhykanov; Kayrat Borgemikov; Beknur Asanov	United States	Kazakhstan

=== Horse racing ===
Event	Gold	Silver	Bronze
Byshty zhorgo 6,000 m	Erke; Kyrgyzstan	Kolonvuud; Kyrgyzstan	Padjet; Kyrgyzstan
Zhorgo salysh 11,000 m	Akzholtoi; Kyrgyzstan	Imperatritsa; Kyrgyzstan	Enesai; Russia
Kunan chabysh 12,000 m	Nurshashu; Kazakhstan	Paris; Kyrgyzstan	Bestau; Kazakhstan
Alaman chabysh 25,000 m	Aiman; Kazakhstan	Kokserek; Kazakhstan	Karagash; Kazakhstan
Distant horse marathon			
Flat racing 1,600 m	Khutulun; Tajikistan	Meteor; Kyrgyzstan	Aisuluu; Kyrgyzstan
Flat racing 2,400 m	Zerek; Kazakhstan	Bakara; Kyrgyzstan	Kozmik Don; Kazakhstan
Flat racing 3,200 m	Beryl Racer; Kazakhstan	El Orda; Kazakhstan	Zheldykara; Kazakhstan

=== Horse competitions ===
Event	Gold	Silver	Bronze
Kok boru	Kyrgyzstan; Tashtemir Mailybashev; Mirbek Mutashev; Edilzhan Toktogul uulu Nurbek Yusupov; Tilek Musabekov; Nazar Koshunbaev; Seyitbek Anarbek uulu Kiyaz Niyazov; Aidarkan Anarbekov; Nurzhan Melisbek uulu Baitegin Omorbekov; Aitbek Zholdoshbek uulu	Kazakhstan	Russia
Kokpar	Kyrgyzstan; Zholdoshbek Orozbaev; Kubanych Sultan uulu Ersultan Aidarkan uulu Dastan Kachkynbaev; Erlan Tolobekov; Rustam Mudunov; Dastan Ruslanov; Dastan Sagynbek uulu Rustam Tynaliev; Manas Niyazov; Iskhak Bekbolot uulu Omurbek Esen uulu	Kazakhstan	Russia
Tyiyn enmei (Tenge ilu)	Kanat Baktybay; Kazakhstan	Azim Esenbek uulu Kyrgyzstan	Baybolat Akylbek; Mongolia
Er enish 60 kg	Kerim Nurtalap; Kazakhstan	Adakhan Bayyshev; Kyrgyzstan	Avilgaji Janibek; Mongolia; Tan Kurmanakaev; Russia
Er enish 70 kg	Mukhammedzhan Sailau; Kazakhstan	Akyl Sagynbekov; Kyrgyzstan	Ismai Amangeldiev; Russia; Myelis Nauryzbek; Mongolia
Er enish 80 kg	Raihan uulu Baktygul; Kyrgyzstan	Rasul Kurayish; Kazakhstan	Nodir Junadilayev; Uzbekistan; Erkinbek Umirtai; Mongolia

=== National wrestling styles ===
Event	Gold	Silver	Bronze
Alysh			
Ashyrtmaly aba gureshi			
Turkmen goresh			
Gushtini milli kamarbandi			
Azerbaijani gyulesh			
Kazakh kuresi			
Tatar koresh	Radik Salakhov; Russia	Bayaman Myktybekov; Kyrgyzstan	Mersad Shaheri; Iran
Uzbek kurash			
Kyrgyz kurosh			
Mongol bökh	Anar Dorj; Mongolia	Munghe Ertine Kuuler; Russia	Surilige; China; Orozbek Ashirov; Kyrgyzstan
Pahlavani	Joozegani Mostafa Taghani; Iran	Seitek Dogdurbek uulu Kyrgyzstan	Bat-Orshikh Batsuuri; Mongolia
Sambo 64 kg	Denis Yakovlev; Russia	Wurinile; China	Zhandos Beisenbayev; Kazakhstan
Sambo 64 kg	Denis Yakovlev; Russia	Wurinile; China	Hassan Poolady; Iran
Sambo 79 kg	Feliks Ulanbekov; Kyrgyzstan	Uladzislau Mardusevich; Belarus	Yerkebulan Negmetov; Kazakhstan
Sambo 79 kg	Feliks Ulanbekov; Kyrgyzstan	Uladzislau Mardusevich; Belarus	Munkhbayar Nergui; Mongolia
Sambo +98 kg	Bolat Sapar; Kazakhstan	Zufarbek Uralov; Uzbekistan	Gleb Pozhakhirko; Russia
Sambo +98 kg	Bolat Sapar; Kazakhstan	Zufarbek Uralov; Uzbekistan	Beredmurat Serik; Mongolia
Ssireum			
Sumo	Sulde Dongak; Kyrgyzstan	Amirani Tsikoridze; Georgia	Sayyn-Belek Tyulush; Russia
Great Nomad Wrestling			
Hapsagai			

=== Traditional strength sports ===
Event	Gold	Silver	Bronze
Strongman	Sajjad Soltaninejad; Iran	Denis Vagapov; Russia	Vadim Makarstov; Kazakhstan
Tug of war 8 on 8	Kazakhstan	Kyrgyzstan	Pakistan
Tug of war 4 on 4	Kazakhstan	Iran; Nader Kazemi; Sajjad Jafari Gohari; Abbas Azimi; Hamidreza Saeed	Kyrgyzstan
Tug-of-war 1 on 1	Kazakhstan	Kyrgyzstan	Pakistan
Armwrestling Men 70 kg			
Armwrestling Men 80 kg			
Armwrestling Men 90 kg			
Armwrestling Men +90 kg			
Armwrestling Women 65 kg			
Armwrestling Women +65 kg			
Tayak tartysh (Mas-wrestling) – Men 70 kg			Ts.Pürevsüren; Mongolia
Mas-wrestling – Men 90 kg			
Mas-wrestling – Men Over 90 kg			
Mas-wrestling – Women 55 kg			M.Anudari; Mongolia
Mas-wrestling – Women 75 kg		D.Baasansüren; Mongolia	
Mas-wrestling – Women Over 75 kg		B.Erdenetuya; Mongolia	

=== Traditional intellectual games ===
Event	Gold	Silver	Bronze
Oware - Women's Individual	Gifty Atogbase; Togo	Aizada Baktybekova; Kyrgyzstan	Asel Dalieva; Kazakhstan
Oware - Men's Individual	Johnson Aramide Adeoye; Nigeria	Atana Laladoma; Togo	Marlis Dulatbekov; Kyrgyzstan; Azasemu Airus; Ghana
Oware - Men's Team			
Oware - Women's Team			Clara Sotoca; France; Colette Gueirard; France
Mangala			
Toguz korgool			

=== Traditional archery ===
Event	Gold	Silver	Bronze
Turkish rule: "Turkish puta" target			
Kyrgyz rule: "Teke buta" target			

=== Traditional horseback archery ===
Event	Gold	Silver	Bronze
Kyrgyz style - Men	Abzal Tulybekov; Kazakhstan	Bader Al-Tamimi; Saudi Arabia	Mergen Mirlanov; Kyrgyzstan
Kyrgyz style - Women	Gunbileg Ganbaatar; Mongolia	Anna Sokulska; Poland	Yulia Lozhnikova; Russia
Hungarian/Magyar style - Men	Raphaël Malet; France		

=== Traditional animal hunting ===
Event	Gold	Silver	Bronze
Kush saluu			
Taigan zharysh			
Dalba			
Burkut saluu			
