= Belt wrestling =

Sport

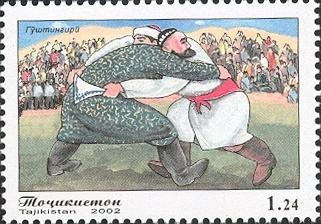
- Focus: Wrestling
- Famous practitioners: Gilgamesh, Kozhomkul, Ivan Poddubny, Qajymuqan
- Olympic sport: No

Belt wrestling is a form of wrestling that is one of the oldest historically recorded sports. It involves two belted contestants aiming to take each other over by grappling with a belt. There are hundreds of national belt wrestling styles, but contemporary most widespread and internationally competed are Alysh and Kurash, developed by the previously nomadic Turkic peoples of Central Asia. United World Wrestling recognized Alysh wrestling as the primary international belt wrestling style. It is regulated globally by the International Federation of Wrestling on Belts Alysh, the sport's governing body. Although the sport has been practiced for millennia, and local championships were held in various places of the world, it was until 2001 when Bayaman Erkinbayev started its international version, and it was called "Alysh". Until 2005, Rif Gaynanov and Bayaman Erkinbayev developed this style together, and then the ways separated. Two different styles appeared named "Alysh" and "Kurash" belt wrestling. Since then, the sport has been included in the 2013 Summer Universiade program, recognized by the Asian Olympic Council, and contested at the Asian Games and Asian Indoor Games. The sport's executives struggle to promote it to the level of an official Olympic sport.

== History ==
Gilgamesh engages in a form of belt wrestling with Enkidu in the Epic of Gilgamesh written around 2000 BC about a king of Sumer who lived around 2800 to 2600 BC. One of the oldest recorded illustrations of wrestling is a bronze statuette, dated to around 2600 BC, found in 1938 at Khafaji, near Baghdad and now stored in the National Museum of Iraq. Chinese Tangshu chronicles also mention belt wrestling in Medieval China circa the 11th century. In the 11th century the scholar and philosopher Avicenna wrote about this type of wrestling.

== Competitions ==
=== Multi-sport events ===
==== Worldwide ====
- Summer Universiade (details)
- World Combat Games
- World Martial Arts Masterships
- World Nomad Games
- World Wrestling Games

==== Regional ====
- Asian Games (details)
- Asian Beach Games
- Asian Indoor Games
- Asian Indoor and Martial Arts Games

==== Sub-Regional ====
- Southeast Asian Games
- North East Olympic Games

=== World Belt Wrestling Championships ===
IBWA - INTERNATIONAL BELT WRESTLING ASSOCIATION

==== Senior ====
The first edition of the championships in 2002 saw competition in the openweight, therefore only two events were contested (men and women.) The 2003' championships were subdivided into weight classes, but because of the rules of the host country no women competition was allowed. Since 2003 the prize money totalling several hundred thousand U.S. dollars was contested among participating teams. Since the 2005' edition onwards the championships were contested in freestyle (belts) and classic style (kushaks.) The 2008' edition saw championships contested at an open-air competition area, on sand, in 45 °C (113 °F) air temperature.

===== Alysh =====
Edition	Year	Dates	City and host country	Venue	Events	Countries	Athletes	Team champion
I	2002	21–22 September	Osh, Kyrgyzstan	Suyumbayev Stadion	2	21		Russia
I	2002	21–22 September	Osh, Kyrgyzstan	Suyumbayev Stadion	2	21		Turkmenistan
II	2003	19–21 December	Tehran, Iran	Azadi Indoor Stadium	4			Russia
III	2004	17–18 December	Istanbul, Turkey		9			Russia
IV	2005	28 September – 2 October	Kazan, Tatarstan, Russia	Basket-Hall	25	44	200+	Russia
V	2006	3–5 November	Almaty, Kazakhstan	Baluan Sholak Sports Palace	25	43	130	Russia
VI	2007	9–13 October	Ufa, Bashkortostan, Russia	Ufa Arena		60		
VII	2008	18–22 November	Lomé, Togo	Stade de Kégué	15	40+		Russia
	2009 (Note: 2009 Alysh Belt Wrestling event was a part of the 4th FILA World Wrestling Games.)	11–13 September	Šiauliai, Lithuania	Šiauliai Arena	4			
VIII	2009	24–26 October	Tashkent, Uzbekistan	Uzbekistan Sports Complex	26	68	400+	Russia
	2010							
IX	2011	13–16 October	Bishkek, Kyrgyzstan	Kozhomkul Sports Palace	19	19	175	
X	2012	26–30 September	Astana, Kazakhstan	Daulet Sports Complex	19	32	300+	
XI	2013	13–16 November	Salavat, Bashkortostan, Russia	Neftehimik Sports Palace	17	38	300+	Russia
XII	2014	19–24 November	Ashgabat, Turkmenistan	Galkynysh Sports Complex				
XIII	2015	19–22 November	Kazan, Tatarstan, Russia	Ak Bars Martial Arts Palace	19	18	140+	
XIV	2016	28–30 October	Naberezhnye Chelny, Tatarstan, Russia	Ice Sports Palace	19	43	250+	Russia
XV	2017	21–24 July	Astana, Kazakhstan	Daulet Sports Complex				Russia
XVI	2018	26–27 October	Kazan, Tatarstan, Russia	Ak Bars Martial Arts Palace		38	200	
XVII	2019	17–24 December	Nur-Sultan, Kazakhstan	Daulet Sports Complex	12	27	275	Kyrgyzstan
XVIII	2020	TBA	TBA					TBD

===== Kurash =====
Edition	Year	Dates	City and host country	Venue	Events	Countries	Athletes	Team champion
I	2010	21–23 May	Kazan, Tatarstan, Russia	Ak Bars Martial Arts Palace	5	16		Russia
II								
III	2014	6–7 December	Orenburg, Russia	Olimpiysky Sports Palace		25		
IV	2015		Kazan, Tatarstan, Russia	Ak Bars Martial Arts Palace		20	64	Russia
	2019	31 October – 3 November	Kazan, Tatarstan, Russia	Ak Bars Martial Arts Palace	13	42	230	
	2019	31 October – 3 November	Minger, Tatarstan, Russia	MINGER Sabantuy Grounds	13	42	230	

===== Goresh =====
Edition	Year	Dates	City and host country	Venue	Events	Countries	Athletes	Team champion
I	2009 (Note: 2009 Goresh Belt Wrestling Championships were a part of the 4th FILA World Wrestling Games.)	11–13 September	Šiauliai, Lithuania	Šiauliai Arena	4			
II	2015	10–15 December	Orenburg, Russia	Olimpiysky Sports Palace		30	160+	Turkmenistan
III	2016	29–30 October	Naberezhnye Chelny, Tatarstan, Russia	Ice Sports Palace	13	19	38	Russia
	2019	September	Ufa, Bashkortostan, Russia	Dynamo Stadium				

===== Multi-style =====
Edition	Year	Dates	City and host country	Venue	Events	Countries	Athletes	Team champion
	2015	9–12 October	Białystok, Poland		23			
	2016 (Note: 2016 BWUWW Championships were a part of the 2nd World Nomad Games.)	7–8 September	Cholpon-Ata, Kyrgyzstan	Equestrian Hippodrome	23			
	2018 (Note: 2018 BWUWW Championships were a part of the 3rd World Nomad Games.)	1–3 September	Cholpon-Ata, Kyrgyzstan	Equestrian Hippodrome	23			
	2020 (Note: 2020 BWUWW Championships would be a part of the 4th World Nomad Games.)		Turkey					

==== Junior ====
Edition	Year	Dates	City and host country	Venue	Events	Countries	Athletes	Team champion
	2006	17–19 November	Saransk, Mordovia, Russia					
	2011	11–14 August	Astrakhan, Russia					
	2012		São Paulo, Brazil					
	2013	8–11 November	Cherkessk, Karachay-Cherkessia, Russia					
	2014	22–24 August	Ulyanovsk, Russia					
	2017	25–28 December	Kazan, Tatarstan, Russia					

==== Cadet ====
Edition	Year	Dates	City and host country	Venue	Events	Countries	Athletes	Team champion
	2005	December	Tehran, Iran					
	2008	12–15 December	Moscow, Russia					
	2012	9–12 August	Ryazan, Russia					
	2013	13–15 December	Nizhnekamsk, Tatarstan, Russia					
	2014	13–16 December	Tyulyachi, Tatarstan, Russia					
	2016	26–28 November	Astana, Kazakhstan					

=== Belt Wrestling World Cup ===
Edition	Year	Dates	City and host country	Venue	Events	Countries	Athletes	Team champion
	2007	13–14 October	Karachayevsk, Karachay-Cherkessia, Russia					
	2010	3–6 December	Oktyabrsky, Bashkortostan, Russia	Oktyabrsky Sports Palace				
	2011	17–20 November	Oktyabrsky, Bashkortostan, Russia	Oktyabrsky Sports Palace				
	2012	8–10 November	Ufa, Bashkortostan, Russia	Dynamo Stadium		22	120	
	2014	5–7 December	Orenburg, Russia	Gazovik Sports Palace		26	300+	
	2015	24–28 September	Alushta, Crimea, Russia					
	2016	10–11 December	Minsk, Belarus					
	2017 (Note: 2017 Belt Wrestling World Cup was part of the International Festival of National Wrestling styles.)	26–28 May	Orenburg, Russia		12	8	140	Tajikistan

=== Regional Championships ===
==== African Championships ====
Edition	Year	Dates	City and host country	Venue	Styles	Events	Countries	Athletes	Team champion
	2017	18–19 May	Cape Town, South Africa		AL, KK, BW				

==== Asian ====
Edition	Year	Dates	City and host country	Venue	Styles	Events	Countries	Athletes	Team champion
I	2011		Mashhad, Iran		KK				
	2015	6–7 August	Tehran, Iran		AL				
	2016	25–26 June							

- Amateur Belt Wrestling Federation India holds meeting

==== Pan-American ====
Edition	Year	Dates	City and host country	Venue	Styles	Events	Countries	Athletes	Team champion
	2015	12–15 November	Buenos Aires, Argentina		BW				

== See also ==
- Jacket wrestling
