= List of international presidential trips made by Kassym-Jomart Tokayev =

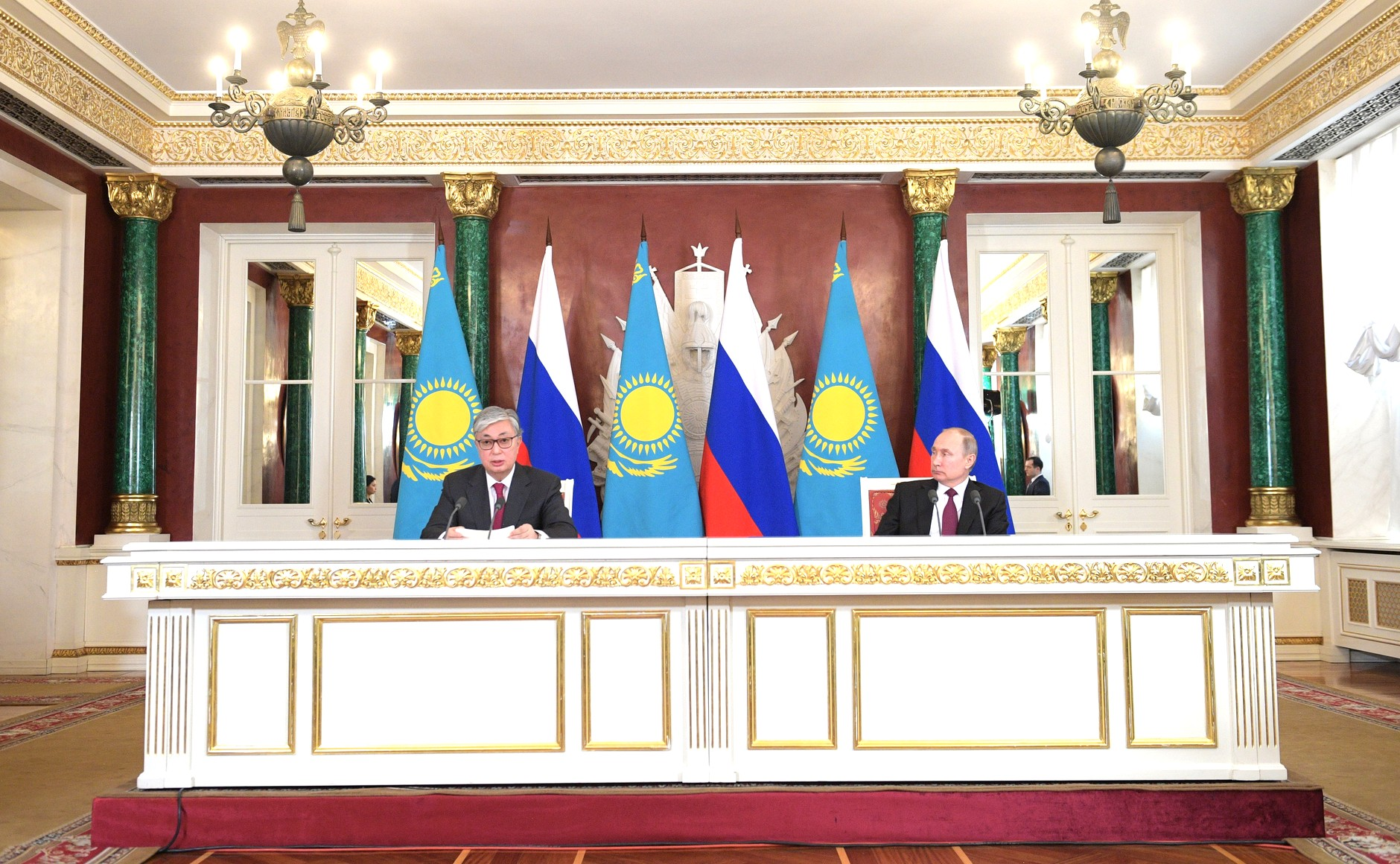
Tokayev and Vladimir Putin during a press conference in the Moscow Kremlin.

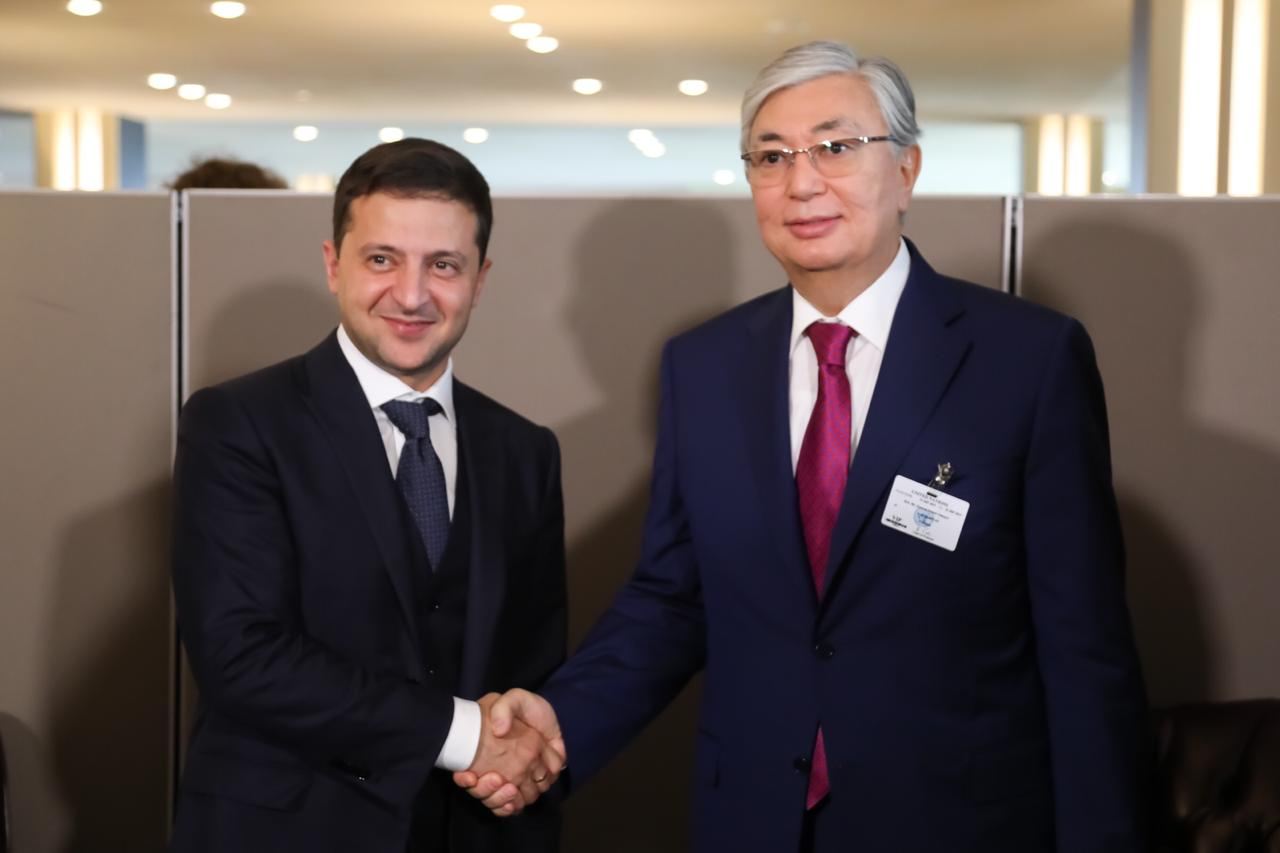
Tokayev and Ukrainian President Volodymyr Zelenskyy in New York City.

This is a list of international trips made by Kassym-Jomart Tokayev in his position as the 2nd president of the Republic of Kazakhstan.

== International trips as president ==
=== 2019 ===
Date	Country	City	Type of visit
3–4 April	Russia	Moscow	State visit
14–15 April	Uzbekistan	Tashkent	State visit
13–14 June	Kyrgyzstan	Bishkek	Working visit
14–15 June	Tajikistan	Dushanbe	Working visit
11–12 September	China	Beijing and Hangzhou	State visit
23–25 September	United States	New York City	Working visit
30 September–1 October	Armenia	Yerevan	Working visit
3 October	Russia	Sochi	Working visit
11 October	Turkmenistan	Ashgabat	Working visit
7 November	Russia	Omsk	Working visit
27–28 November	Kyrgyzstan	Bishkek	State visit
5–6 December	Germany	Berlin	State visit

=== 2020 ===
Date	Country	City	Type of visit
28–29 January	United Arab Emirates	Abu Dhabi	State visit
14–16 February	Germany	Munich	Working visit
23–24 June	Russia	Moscow	Working visit

=== 2021 ===
Date	Country	City	Type of visit
19–20 May	Tajikistan	Dushanbe	State visit
5 August	Turkmenistan	Türkmenbaşy	Working visit
16–18 August	South Korea	Seoul	State visit
21 August	Russia	Moscow	Working visit

=== 2022 ===
Date	Country	City	Type of visit
10–11 May	Turkey	Ankara	State visit
15 May	UAE	Abu Dhabi	Working visit
15–16 May	Russia	Moscow	Working visit
17 June	Russia	St. Petersburg	Working visit
19 June	Iran	Tehran	State visit
21 June	Qatar	Doha	Working visit
29 June	Turkmenistan	Ashgabat	Working visit
20–21 July	Kyrgyzstan	Cholpon-Ata	Working visit
23–24 July	Saudi Arabia	Jeddah	State visit
19 August	Russia	Sochi	Working visit
24 August	Azerbaijan	Baku	State visit
15–16 September	Uzbekistan	Samarkand	Working visit
19–21 September	United States	New York City	Working visit
23 November	Armenia	Yerevan	Working visit
27–28 November	Russia	Moscow	Working visit
29–30 November	France	Paris	Working visit
9 December	Kyrgyzstan	Bishkek	Working visit
21–22 December	Uzbekistan	Tashkent	State visit

=== 2023 ===
Date	Country	City	Type of visit
8–9 May	Russia	Moscow	Working visit.
17–19 May	China	Xi'an	Working visit.
June 2	Kyrgyzstan	Cholpon-Ata	Working visit
June 3	Turkey	Ankara	Working visit
21–24 August	Vietnam	Hanoi	State visit
14–15 September	Tajikistan	Dushanbe	Working visit
19–21 September	United States	New York City	Working visit
28–29 September	Germany	Berlin	State visit
17–18 October	China	Beijing	State visit
25-26 December	Russia	Saint Petersburg	Working visit

=== 2024 ===
Date	Country	City	Type of visit
17–19 January	Italy	Rome	State visit.
17–19 January	Vatican City	Vatican City	State visit.
13-14 February	Qatar	Doha	State visit.
21 February	Russia	Kazan	Working visit.
11-12 March	Azerbaijan	Baku	State visit
5 April	Uzbekistan	Khiva	Working visit.
8–9 May	Russia	Moscow	Working visit.
22-24 May	Singapore	Singapore	State visit.
28-29 October	Mongolia	Ulaanbaatar	State visit.
20–21 November	Hungary	Budapest	Working visit.

=== 2025 ===
Date	Country	City	Type of visit
15–16 January	United Arab Emirates	Abu Dhabi	Attended the Abu Dhabi Sustainability Week Summit.
18–19 February	Jordan	Amman	State visit to Hashemite Kingdom of Jordan by invitation of King Abdullah II.
3-4 April	Uzbekistan	Samarkand	Working visit for participation in Central Asia – European union summit.
8–9 May	Russia	Moscow	Working visit for participation in 80th Moscow victory day parade.
20–21 May	Hungary	Budapest	Working visit for unofficial summit of organization of Turkic states.
26–27 June	Belarus	Minsk	Working visit for participation in summit of Eurasian Economic Union.
28–29 July	Turkey	Ankara	State visit by invitation of president Recep Tayyip Erdoğan.
4–5 August	Turkmenistan	Ashgabat	Working visit.
21-22 August	Kyrgyzstan	Bishkek	State visit by invitation of president Sadyr Japarov.
30 August - 3 September	China	Tianjin and Beijing	Working visit for participation in Tianjin Shanghai Cooperation Organization summit and participation in Beijing 80th victory day parade.
22-24 September	USA	New York City	Participation in 80th United Nations General Assembly
6–7 October	Azerbaijan	Qabala	Participation in the summit of Organization of Turkic States in Qabala
9-10 October	Tajikistan	Dushanbe	Working visit for participation in Commonwealth of Independent States summit and 2nd Central Asia - Russia summit by invitation of Emomali Rahmon, President of Tajikistan
6-7 November	USA	Washington City	Working visit
11-12 November	Russia	Moscow	State visit
18-20 December	Japan	Tokyo	Working visit.

=== 2026 ===
Date	Country	City	Type of visit
22 January	Switzerland	Davos	Working visit. Participated in the signed the founding charter of the Board of Peace.
3-4 February	Pakistan	Islamabad	State visit. First Kazakh President to visit Pakistan since 2003.
18-19 February	USA	Washington, D.C.	Working visit. Participated in inaugural Board of Peace summit.
11 April	Uzbekistan	Bukhara	Working visit.
17 April	Turkey	Antalya	Attended the Antalya Diplomacy Forum
8-9 May	Russia	Moscow	Working visit for participation in Moscow Victory Day Parade.
22-23 June	Belgium	Brussels	State visit.
13 July	Qatar	Doha	Gave condolences for the death of former Emir.
15-17 July	China	Shanghai	Attended the World AI Conference.
25 July	Russia	Omsk	Working visit.
31 July – 1 August	Kyrgyzstan	Cholpon-Ata	Working visit.
31 August – 1 September	Kyrgyzstan	Bishkek	Attended the SCO summit and the opening ceremony of the 6th World Nomad Games.
12-13 September	India	New Delhi	Attended the 18th BRICS summit.
14-16 September	South Korea	Seoul	State visit. Attended the 1st Korea-Central Asia summit.
28-30 September	Germany	Berlin and Munich	State visit by invitation of chancellor Friedrich Merz.
7–9 October	Turkmenistan	Awaza National Tourist Zone	Attended the CIS summit.
14–15 October	Azerbaijan	Baku	Attended the CICA summit.
15–16 October	Armenia	Yerevan	Attended the 17th meeting of the COP 17 for Biodiversity (CBD).
28–30 October	Turkey	Ankara	State visit by invitation of president Recep Tayyip Erdoğan. Attended the 13th OTS summit.
10–11 November	Russia	Moscow	Attended the CSTO summit.

== Future visits ==
Country	Areas visited	Date(s)	Notes
United States	Miami	14–15 December	Tokayev is scheduled to attend the G20 summit.
Russia	Saint Petersburg	21 December	Tokayev is plan to attend the EAEU and informal CIS summit.

== Gallery ==
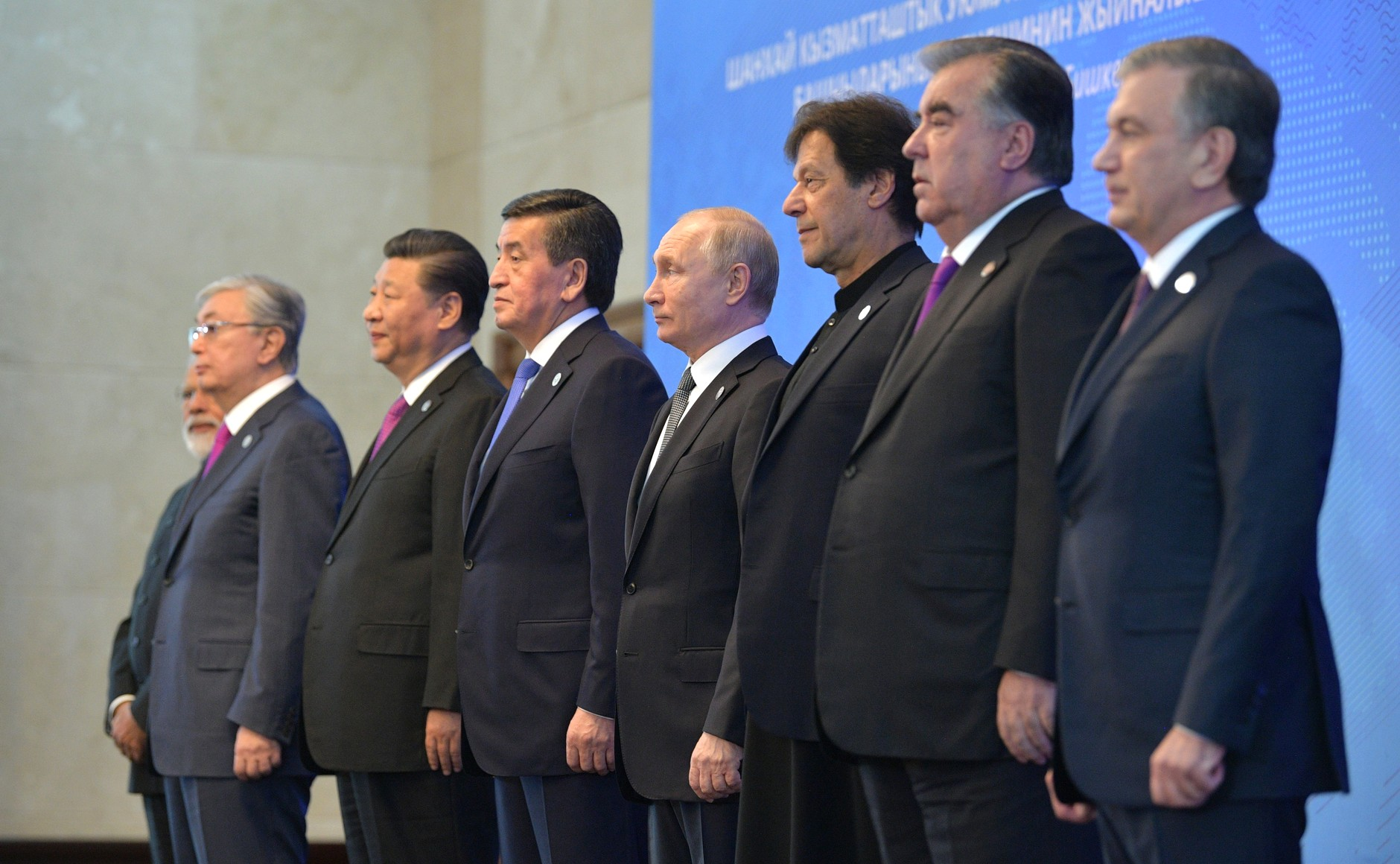
Tokayev (far left) at the SCO Summit in Bishkek.

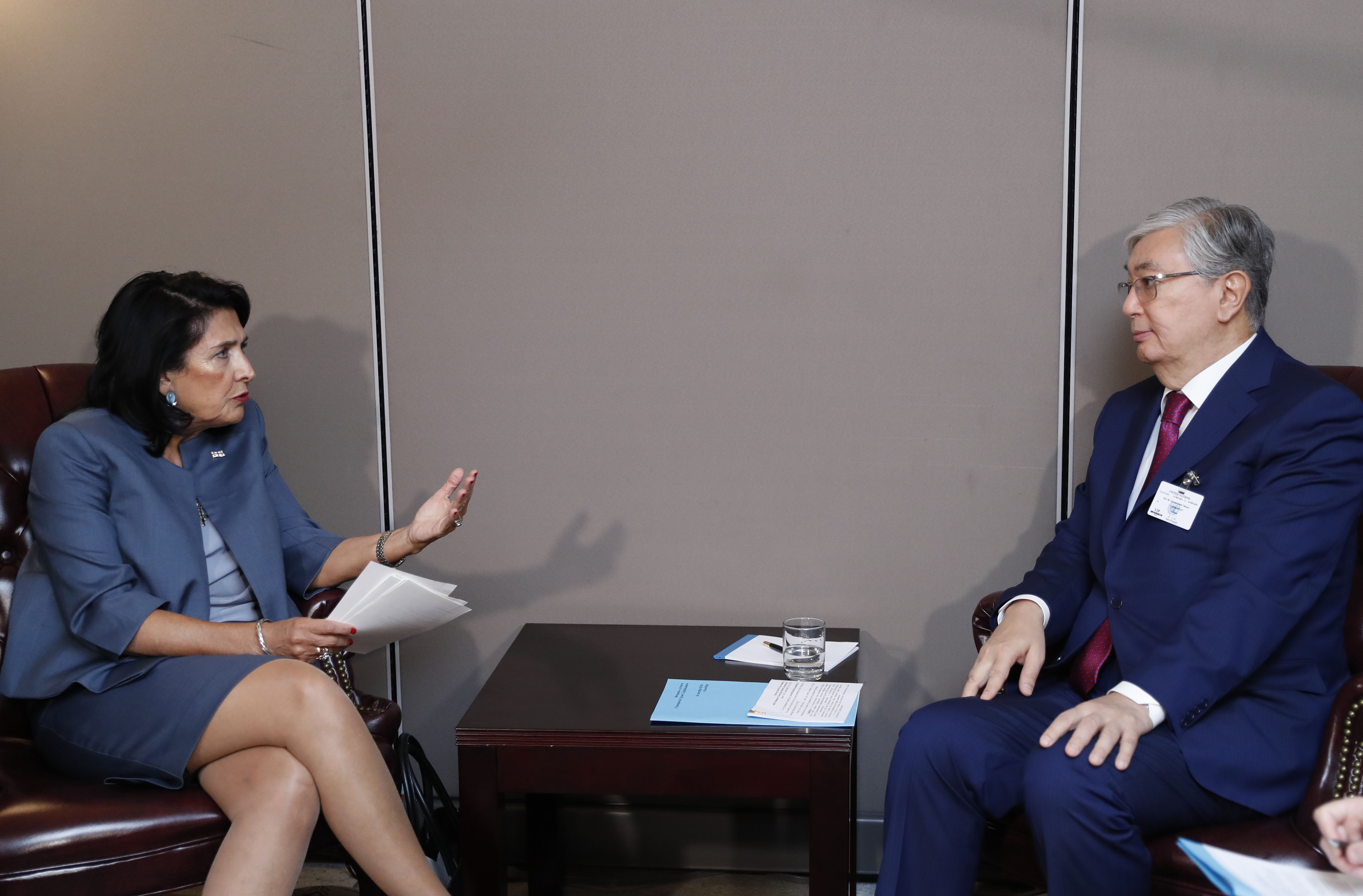
Georgian President Salome Zourabichvili meeting with Tokayev on the sidelines of the Seventy-third session of the United Nations General Assembly.

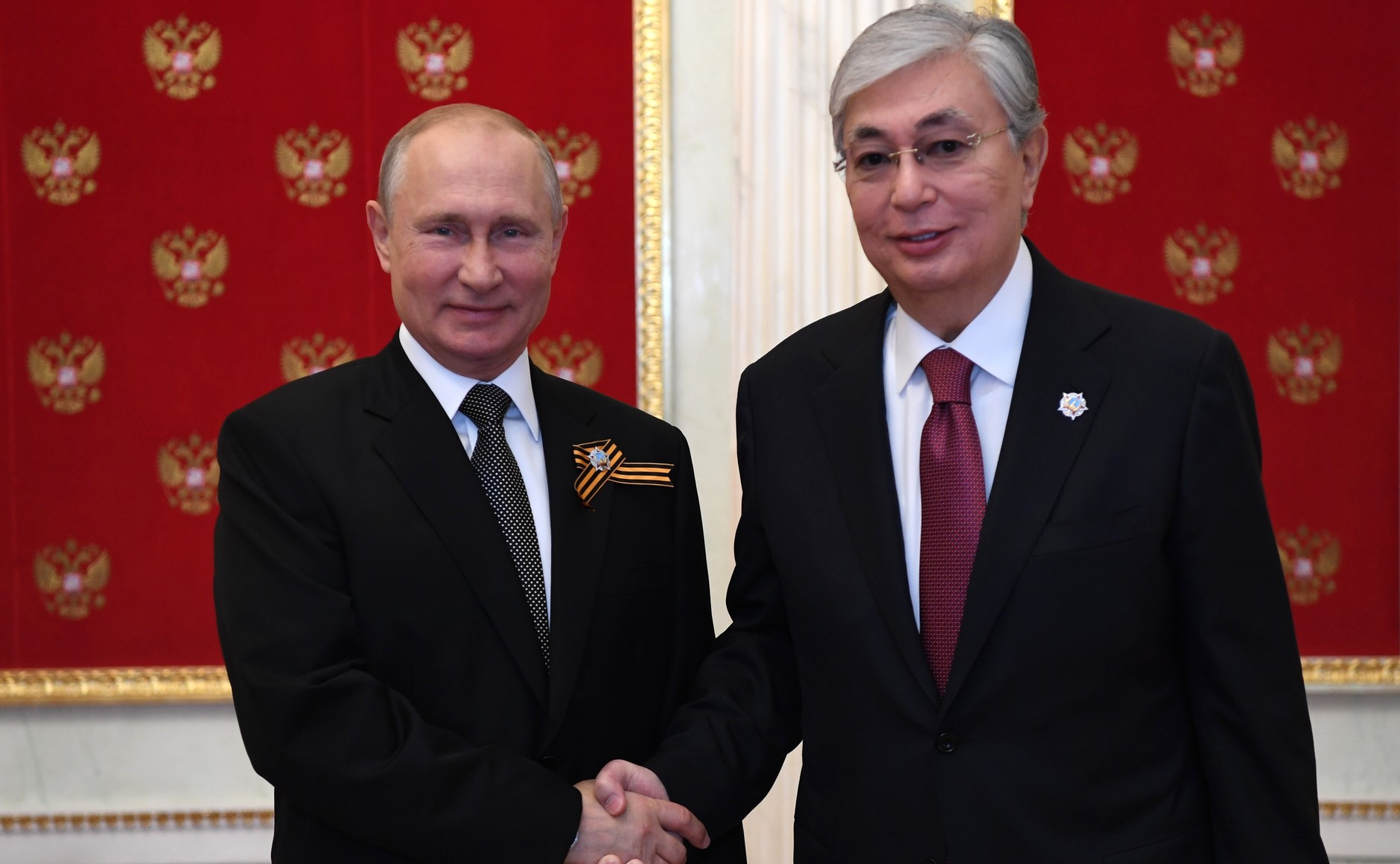
Tokayev with Vladimir Putin prior to the Moscow Victory Day Parade.
