= Bat-Erdeniin Ganzorig =

Mongolian archer (19 October 1999)

Personal information
- Nationality: Mongolian
- Born: 19 October 1999 (age 26) Zavkhan Province, Mongol Uls
Medal record
Men's traditional archery
Representing Mongolia
World Cup
Gold medal – first place	2025 Ulsan	Zhamby 30 m
Gold medal – first place	2025 Ulsan	Puta 70 m
Asian Championships
Gold medal – first place	2026 Turkistan	Zhamby 30 m
World Nomad Games
Gold medal – first place	2026 Kyrchyn Gorge	Gungdo 145 m

Bat-Erdeniin Ganzorig (19 October 1999) is a Mongolian archer. In Mongolian archery, Ganzorig holds the title of "Aimgiin gots kharvaach (The Best Archer of Province)".

Ganzorig held a winner title at the 2025 World Traditional Archery Cup in Ulsan, South Korea, claiming two gold medals in the 30-meter Kazakh Zhamby target and 70-meter Turkish Puta target archery events. Не also received the Grand Prix or top award for the highest overall combined score across all distances, with a perfect 100% result at the 70-meter distance. Ganzorig is the 2021 national champion in the traditional archery.

Ganzorig held the winner title at the 2026 Asian Traditional Archery Championship in Turkistan, Kazakhstan, claiming the gold medal in the 30-meter Kazakh Zhamby target archery event.

Ganzorig held the champion title at the 6th World Nomad Games in Kyrchyn Gorge, Kyrgyzstan, winning the gold medal in the 145-meter Korean Gungdo target archery event.
