= 2014 World Nomad Games =

International multi-sport event

1st World Nomad Games
- Host city: Cholpon-Ata, Kyrgyzstan
- Nations: 19
- Athletes: 400
- Events: 10 sports
- Opening: 9 September 2014
- Closing: 14 September 2014
- Opened by: Almazbek Atambaev; President of Kyrgyzstan

The 2014 World Nomad Games, officially known as the 1st World Nomad Games, was the inaugural edition held in Cholpon-Ata, Kyrgyzstan from 9–14 September 2014 with 19 sports featured in the games. While organising the first edition of the Games, the Kyrgyz government spent more than 3 million dollars. More than 400 athletes from 20 countries took part in the event.

== A cultural program ==
The Games are surrounded by a cultural and ethnical program. During the first edition of the Games, a yurt village was installed. Cultural events and entertaining activities not linked with the Games' disciplines also took place.

== Competitive sports ==
Ten sports were played competitively at the games:

- The equestrian sports of
  - Kok Boru, team game on horseback, featuring the carrying of a goat carcass
  - Er Enish, wrestling on horseback
  - Kunan chabysh, a young horse race
  - Zhorgo salysh, (aka Jorgo salysh) a trotting race
  - Alaman Baige, a long distance uneven terrain race
- The traditional wrestling sports of:
  - Kyrgyz Kurosh
  - Alysh (belt-wrestling)
  - Kazakh Kurosh
- Two Kyrgyz national games:
  - Ordo, an ankle bone shooting game
  - Toguz korgool, a strategy board game

== Demonstration sports ==
The games also featured demonstration performances of other sports:

- Zorhana, a form of wrestling from Azerbaijan and Iran
- Cirit (from Turkey), a sport played on horseback
- Traditional Turkish wrestling
- Taekkyon (from the Republic of Korea)
- Salbuurun, eagle hunting
- Tyin Enmei, picking up a coin while upon a galloping horse
- Kyz Kuumai, ("girl chasing"), featuring a woman and a man on horseback, the man initially chasing the woman, but if too slow then being chased and whipped by the woman

== Medal table ==
The Kyrgyz team won the most medals, with the Kazakh team coming second and Turkmenistan third.

Rank	Nation	Gold	Silver	Bronze	Total
1	Kyrgyzstan (KGZ)	16	20	19	55
2	Kazakhstan (KAZ)	10	9	9	28
3	Turkmenistan (TKM)	3	0	3	6
4	Tajikistan (TJK)	1	0	3	4
5	Mongolia (MNG)	0	1	6	7
6	Russia (RUS)	0	0	5	5
7	Uzbekistan (UZB)	0	0	4	4
Totals (7 entries)		30	30	49	109
