= Navid Mirzapour =

Iranian wrestler (born 2001)

Personal information
- Full name: Navid Mirzapour
- Born: 13 July 2003
- Died: 13 July 2003 (age 23) Torbat-e Jam, Iran
- Occupation: Kurash
- Height: 181 m (593 ft 10 in)
- Weight: 90 kg (198 lb)

Sport
- Country: Iran
- Sport: wrestler, Kurash, Alysh, sumo
- Weight class: ‍–‍81 kg
Medal record
Men's Aba Guresh Wrestling
Representing Iran
World Nomad Games Championships
Bronze medal – third place	2024 Kazakhstan	80kg
World Senior Aba Wrestling Championships
Bronze medal – third place	2023 Turkey	70kg
Guresh Wrestling
Gold medal – first place	2024 Iran	68kg

Navid Mirzapour (Persian: نوید میرزاپور; born 13 July 2003) is an Iranian freestyle wrestler, Kurash practitioner, Alysh wrestler, and sumo wrestler. In addition to winning several national championships, he was invited to the national team training camp in 2019. Among his achievements are a bronze medal at the 2023 World Aba Wrestling Senior Championships in Turkey and a gold medal at the 2024 Iranian Senior International Guresh Wrestling. In 2024, he won a bronze medal at the World Senior Nomad Games Aba Guresh Wrestling Championships in Kazakhstan. In 2018, Mirzapour was the runner-up at the Iranian National Elite Freestyle Wrestling Olympiad.

== Sports career ==
Mirzapour was the runner-up at the Iranian National Elite Freestyle Wrestling Olympiad in 2018. In 2022 and 2023, he won the national championship in the 66 kg and 74 kg weight classes, respectively, at the Iranian Junior Chukheh Wrestling Championships. In 2023, he also won the national championship in the 60 kg weight class at the Iranian Senior Alysh Championships and became a member of the national team.

In 2024, Mirzapour won the Iranian national championship in sumo and became a member of the national team. In 2025, he won the 75 kg weight class at the Iranian Mokhtumquli Fraghi Cup. In the same year, he also won the national championship in the 75 kg weight class at the Iranian Senior Guresh Wrestling Championships.

At the 2023 World Senior Aba Wrestling Championships in Turkey, Mirzapour won the bronze medal in the 70 kg weight class. In the same year, he won the gold medal in the 68 kg weight class at the Iranian Senior International Guresh Wrestling Championships. In 2024, he won the bronze medal in the 80 kg weight class at the Senior Aba Guresh Wrestling Championships at the World Nomad Games in Kazakhstan.

== Achievements ==
- Bronze medal at the 2024 Senior Aba Guresh Wrestling Championships at the World Nomad Games in Kazakhstan, in the 80 kg weight class.
- Bronze medal at the 2023 World Senior Aba Wrestling Championships in Turkey, in the 70 kg weight class.
- Gold medal at the 2024 Iranian Senior International Guresh Wrestling Championships, in the 68 kg weight class.
