= Cholpon =

Cholpon (Kyrgyz: Чолпон, Çolpon) means morning star (Venus) in Kyrgyz language and may refer to:

== Localities in Kyrgyzstan ==
- Cholpon-Ata, a resort town
  - Cholpon-Ata Airport
- Cholpon, Issyk-Kul, a village
- Cholpon, Naryn, a village

== People with the given name ==
- Cholpon Orozobekova (born 1975), Kyrgyz journalist
- Cholpon Sultanbekova (born 1969), Kyrgyz politician
- Choʻlpon (1893–1938), Uzbek poet, playwright, novelist and translator

== See also ==
- Chulpan (disambiguation), a Tatar-language version of Cholpon
