= Feliks Ulanbekov =

Kyrgyzstani sambist (born 2000)

Personal information
- Nationality: Kyrgyzstan
- Born: 2000 (age 25–26)

Sport
- Sport: Sambo
Medal record
Men's sambo
Representing Kyrgyzstan
World Championships
Silver medal – second place	2022 Bishkek	71 kg
World Nomad Games
Gold medal – first place	2026 Cholpon-Ata	79 kg
Asian and Oceanian Championships
Silver medal – second place	2026 Manila	88 kg

Feliks Ulanbekov (born 2000) is a Kyrgyzstani sambist. He is a silver medalist at the World Sambo Championships, Asian and Oceanian Sambo Championships and a gold medalist at the World Nomad Games.

== Career ==
At the 2018 Asian Youth and Junior Championships, Ulanbekov won a silver medal in the 56 kg youth category. He returned to the Asian Youth and Junior Championships the following year and won the gold medal in the 62 kg category. At the 2020 World Youth and Junior Championships, he won the silver medal in the 68 kg junior category.

In February 2022, Ulanbekov won the silver medal Kyrgyzstan Sambo Championships in his category. In November 2022, he won the silver medal at the World Sambo Championships in the 71 kg category. In February 2023, he won the gold medal at the Kyrgyzstan Sambo Championships in the 79 kg category.

At the 2026 Asian and Oceanian Championships, Ulanbekov competed in the 88 kg category and won the silver medal. At the 2026 World Nomad Games, he won the gold medal in the 79 kg category.
