= Salburun =

Traditional hunt in Central Asia

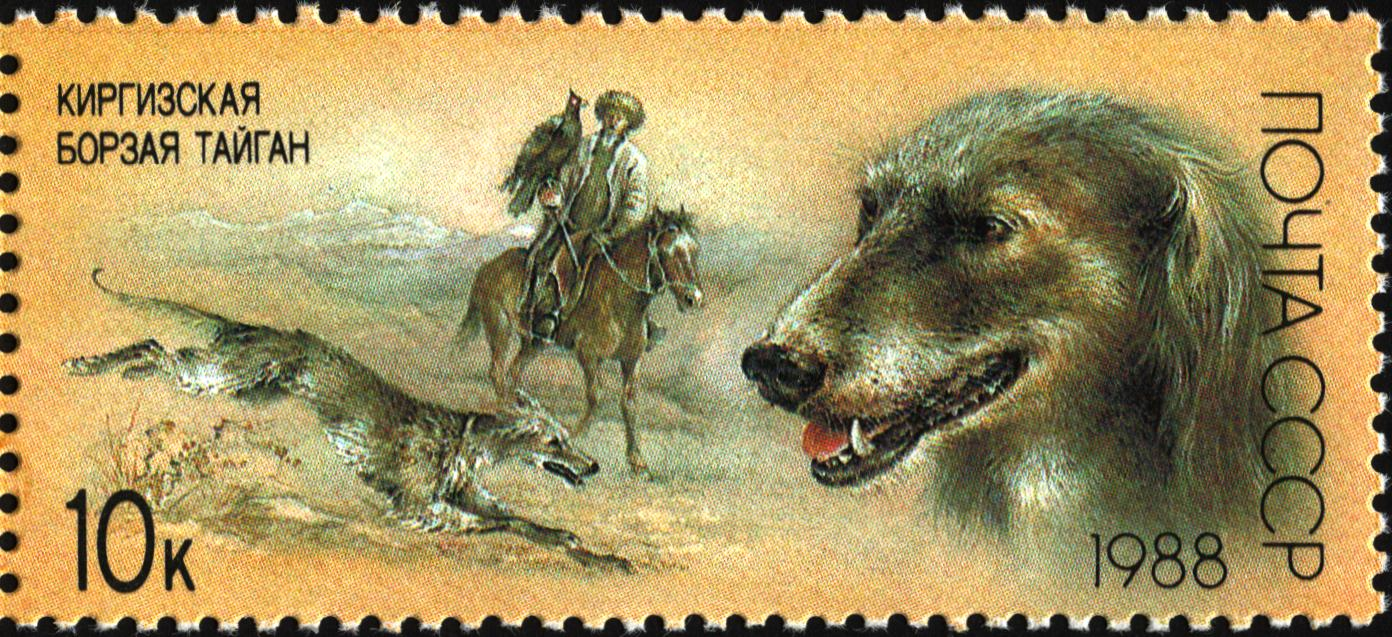
USSR stamp, 1988. The rider with his Taigan and his bird of prey are symbolic of the Kyrgyz hunter.

Salburun (Kyrgyz : Салбуурун) is a traditional kind of hunting among the Kyrgyz of Central Asia, involving falconry, archery (sometimes mounted), as well as use of a taigan.

At the end of Salburun contests, the winners of the different disciplines receive an award. The main disciplines are:

- Hunting with falcons,
- Hunting with taigan,
- Taigan races,
- Mounted archery.

Salburun comes from the nomadic tradition of hunting and protecting herds from predators such as wolves. Festivals have been organised in Central Asia since 1997. After the festival of 2006 in Tong district, Kyrgyzstan, international reactions to the violence of the event led the Salburun Federation to rethink the rules and take measures for animal defense. In 2015, a petition has been launched to end wolf baiting.

Salburun is one of the World Nomad Games' disciplines.
