= Bolat =

Bolat is both a given name and surname. Notable people with the surname include:

Given name:

- Bolat Aqşolaqov, Kazakhstani politician
- Bolat Atabaev, Kazakhstani theater director
- Bolat Asanov, Kazakhstani chess grandmaster
- Bolat Niyazymbetov, Kazakhstani boxer
- Bolat Nurgaliyev, Kazakhstani diplomat
- Bolat Raimbekov, Kazakhstani road bicycle racer
- Bolat Sapar, Kazakhstani sambist
- Bolat Zhamishev, Kazakhstani politician

Surname:

- Ömer Bolat, Turkish academic
- Sinan Bolat, Turkish footballer
- Timur Bolat, Kazakhstani judoka
- Yusuf Bolat, Soviet writer
