= World Nomad Games =

International sports competition dedicated to Central Asian sports

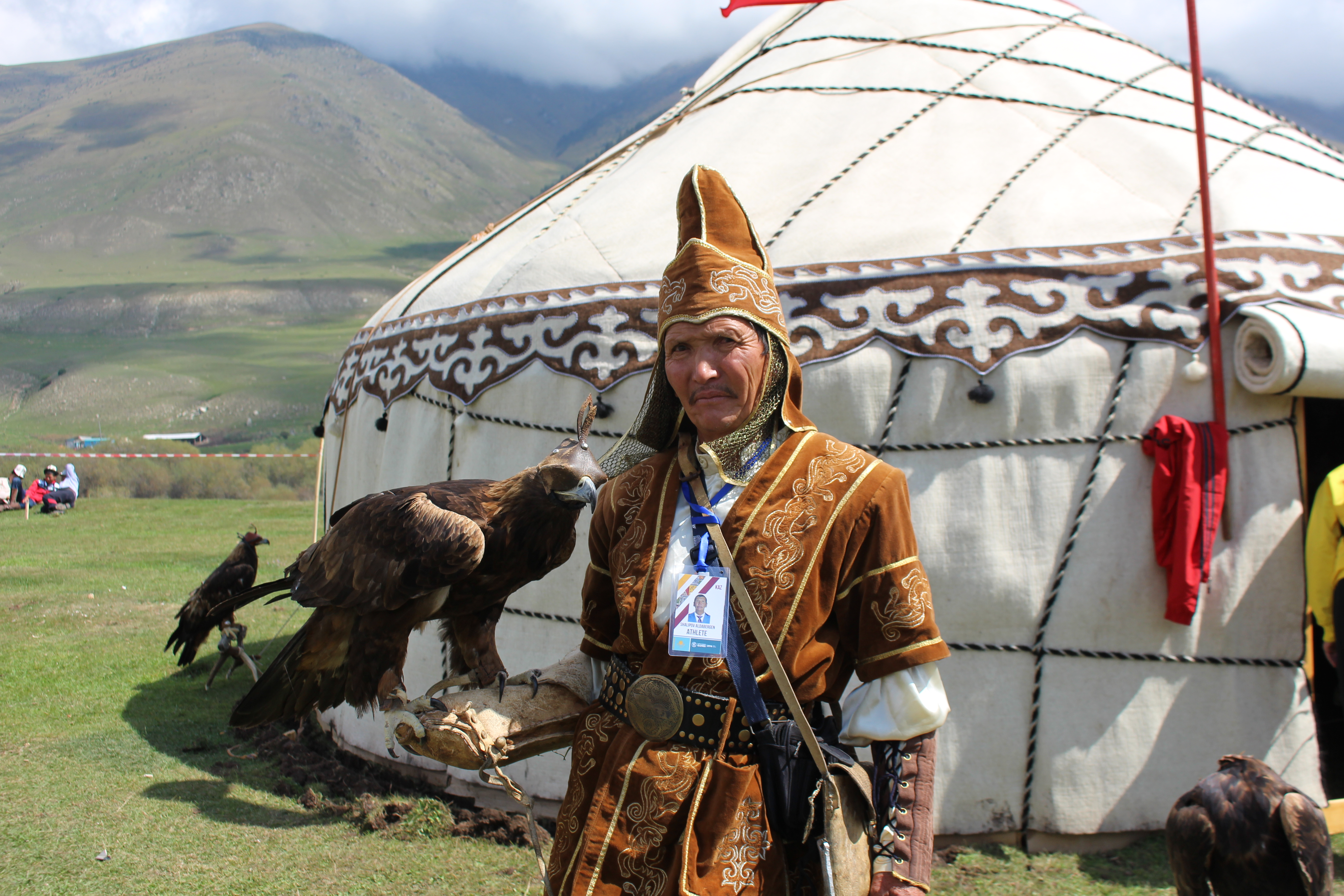
World Nomad Games athlete and a golden eagle

The World Nomad Games are a biennial international sports competition dedicated to ethnic sports practiced in Central Asia.

The first three World Nomad Games were held in Cholpon-Ata, Kyrgyzstan. The fourth games were held in Iznik, Turkey, in 2022. More than 3000 athletes from 102 countries participated in the events. The fifth games were held in Astana, Kazakhstan, and attracted more than 2500 athletes from 89 countries while also having 5 billion Kazakhstani tenge spent on them. In 2026, the games returned to host country Kyrgyzstan to be held from 31 August to 6 September.

In 2021, the World Nomad Games were included by UNESCO on its lists of intangible cultural heritage as "Register of Best Safeguarding Practices" under the 2003 Convention for the Safeguarding of the Intangible Cultural Heritage.

== History ==
Its creator, philanthropist Askhat Akibaev, worked as the head of many Kyrgyz sports federations. Because of his work, he often participated in sporting events that promoted the culture of specific countries such as Japan and Mongolia. It was then that he began to envision a festival that would focus on the history of Kyrgyzstan.

However, realizing that showcasing Kyrgyz culture alone might not be sufficiently appealing, Akibaev decided to incorporate the traditions of nomadic peoples from various corners of the world into the festival, which was slowly taking shape. "We don't want the games to be just about Kyrgyzstan, but to serve as an opportunity for other nomadic cultures and small communities to showcase their ethnic traditions and sports." This motto gave rise to the World Nomad Games, the Olympics for Nomadic Peoples, which has brought together more than 70 countries biennially since 2014 to compete in 37 sports with nomadic traditions.

The person who launched and supported the World Nomad Games in 2014 at the highest state level is the President of Kyrgyzstan Almazbek Atambayev. Atambayev supported it in order to preserve and popularize the nomadic traditions of Central Asia.

The World Nomad Games have become a platform for demonstrating the cultural heritage, sports skills and traditional sports of nomadic nations, promoting the strengthening of cultural ties and mutual understanding between the peoples of different countries.

Atambayev personally led the Kyrgyz national team on the opening ceremony of the first World Nomad Games in 2014 and 2016 in order to popularize the event.

== Sports and disciplines ==
- Alysh (Kyrgyz: Алыш), a kind of belt wrestling
- Salburun (Kyrgyz: Салбурун), a sport mixing falconry, mounted archery and hunt assisted by Taigan
- Shagai, throwing sheep bones, referred to as Ordo in Kyrgyzstan
- Horse racing (At Chabysh), (Kyrgyz: Ат чабыш)
- Er enish, (Kyrgyz: Эр эңиш)
- Toguz korgool, (Kyrgyz: Тогуз коргоол)
- Kourach
- Kok-boru, a sport similar to Buzkashi, where riders fight for a goat carcass. (Kyrgyz: Көк бөрү); also called Kokpar in Kazakhstan.
- Mangala, a Turkish Mancala game, as well as other national variants

== Editions ==
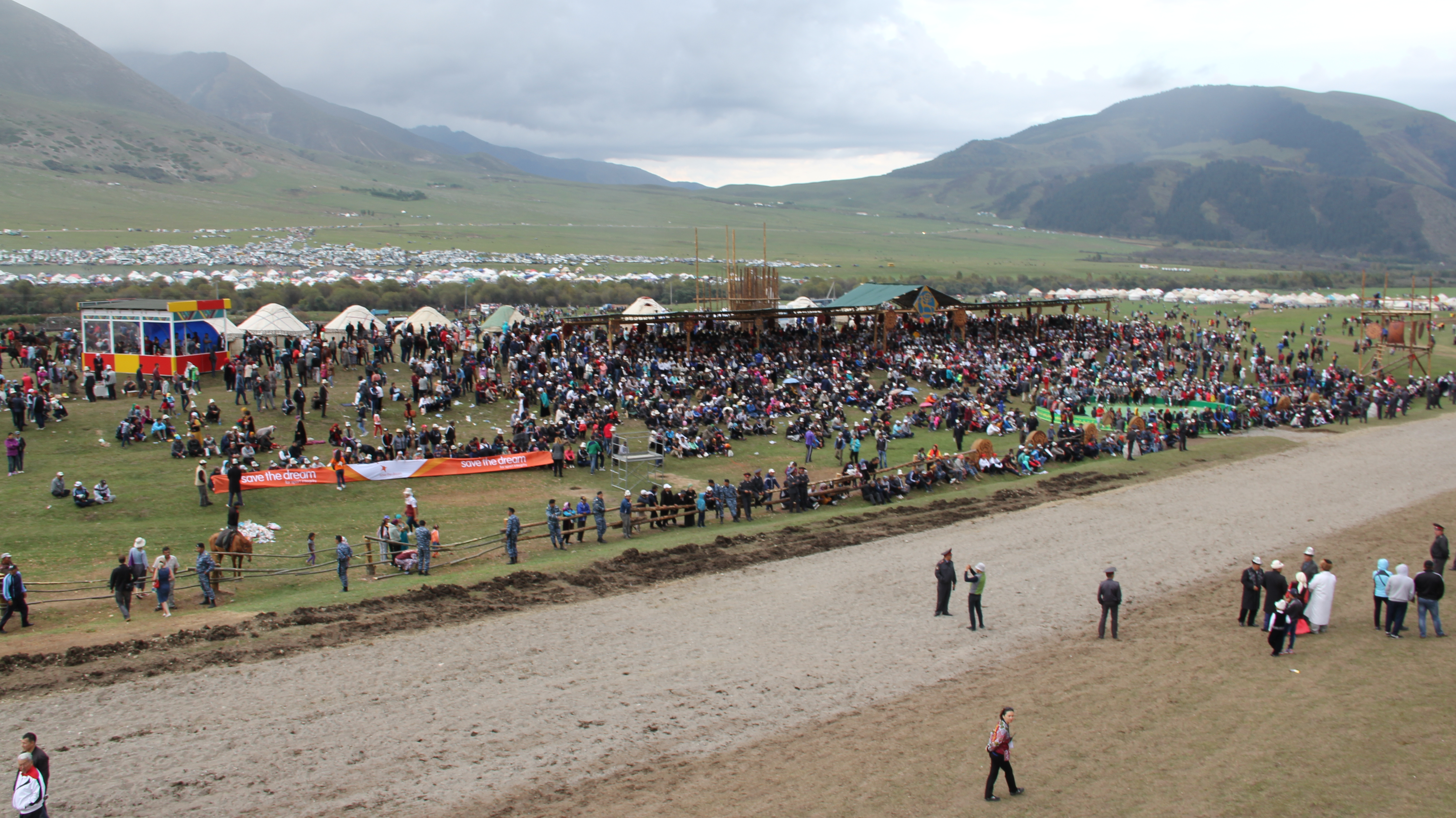
2016 nomadic village

Number	Year	Host country	Host city	Sports
1	2014	Kyrgyzstan	Cholpon-Ata	10 + 4
2	2016	Kyrgyzstan	Cholpon-Ata	23
3	2018	Kyrgyzstan	Cholpon-Ata	37
4	2022	Turkey	Iznik	12 + 11
5	2024	Kazakhstan	Astana	20
6	2026	Kyrgyzstan	Bishkek; Cholpon-Ata; Kyrchyn Gorge, Karakol	43
7	2028	Russia	Kazan	TBA

- The 2020 event was delayed until 2022 as a result of the COVID-19 pandemic.
- The 2022 event was scheduled to include 44 sports but was later reduced to 12 sports + 11 exhibition sports.

== Medals (2014–2018) ==
Rank	Team	Gold	Silver	Bronze	Total
1	Kyrgyzstan (KGZ)	81	77	79	237
2	Kazakhstan (KAZ)	40	46	52	138
3	Russia (RUS)	29	17	42	88
4	Turkmenistan (TKM)	28	8	21	57
5	Uzbekistan (UZB)	8	12	29	49
6	Iran (IRI)	6	8	16	30
7	Azerbaijan (AZE)	5	10	15	30
8	Hungary (HUN)	5	4	8	17
9	Ukraine (UKR)	3	7	10	20
10	Mongolia (MGL)	3	6	23	32
11	Turkey (TUR)	3	1	3	7
12	Tajikistan (TJK)	2	4	7	13
13	Georgia (GEO)	2	3	3	8
14	Serbia (SRB)	2	1	1	4
15	Antigua and Barbuda	2	0	1	3
16	Bashkortostan	1	3	6	10
17	Tatarstan	1	2	2	5
18	Slovakia (SVK)	1	2	0	3
19	China (CHN)	1	1	8	10
20	Lithuania (LTU)	1	0	5	6
21	Moldova (MDA)	1	0	4	5
22	Latvia (LAT)	1	0	2	3
23	Bulgaria (BUL)	1	0	1	2
23	Germany (GER)	1	0	1	2
23	United Arab Emirates (UAE)	1	0	1	2
26	United States (USA)	0	3	4	7
27	Armenia (ARM)	0	2	2	4
28	Poland (POL)	0	2	1	3
29	Ghana (GHA)	0	2	0	2
30	Argentina (ARG)	0	1	2	3
31	Ecuador (ECU)	0	1	1	2
31	Estonia (EST)	0	1	1	2
33	Belarus (BLR)	0	0	2	2
33	India (IND)	0	0	2	2
33	South Korea (KOR)	0	0	2	2
36	Afghanistan (AFG)	0	0	1	1
36	Brazil (BRA)	0	0	1	1
36	Japan (JPN)	0	0	1	1
36	Netherlands (NED)	0	0	1	1
36	Norway (NOR)	0	0	1	1
36	Singapore (SIN)	0	0	1	1
Totals (41 entries)		229	224	363	816

== See also ==
- Nomad
