= Izimka =

Izimka Изимка
- Village
- Location within Bashkortostan Location within Russia
- Coordinates: 54°47′N 54°12′E
- Country: Russia
- Region: Bashkortostan
- District: Sharansky District
- Time zone: UTC+5:00

Izimka (Russian: Изимка; Bashkir: Изем, İzem) is a rural locality (a village) in Nureyevsky Selsoviet, Sharansky District, Bashkortostan, Russia. The population was 70 as of 2010.

== Geography ==
Izimka is located 27 km southeast of Sharan (the district's administrative centre) by road. Nureyevo is the nearest rural locality.
