= Kyzyl-Chulpan =

Kyzyl-Chulpan Кызыл-Чулпан
- Village
- Location within Bashkortostan Location within Russia
- Coordinates: 54°45′N 54°11′E
- Country: Russia
- Region: Bashkortostan
- District: Sharansky District
- Time zone: UTC+5:00

Kyzyl-Chulpan (Russian: Кызыл-Чулпан; Bashkir: Ҡыҙыл Сулпан, Qıźıl Sulpan) is a rural locality (a village) in Nureyevsky Selsoviet, Sharansky District, Bashkortostan, Russia. The population was 26 as of 2010. There is 1 street.

== Geography ==
Kyzyl-Chulpan is located 24 km southeast of Sharan (the district's administrative centre) by road. Nureyevo is the nearest rural locality.
