= Bolat Sapar =

Kazakhstani sambist (born 2001)

Personal information
- Nationality: Kazakhstan
- Born: 11 April 2001 (age 25)

Sport
- Sport: Sambo
Medal record
Men's sambo
Representing Kazakhstan
World Beach Championships
Silver medal – second place	2023 Juan Dolio	88 kg
Bronze medal – third place	2025 Singapore	+88 kg
World Nomad Games
Gold medal – first place	2026 Cholpon-Ata	+98 kg
Asian and Oceanian Championships
Gold medal – first place	2024 Macau	98 kg
Silver medal – second place	2026 Manila	+98 kg

Bolat Sapar (born 11 April 2001) is a Kazakhstani sambist. He has won multiple medals at the World Beach Sambo Championships, Asian and Oceanian Sambo Championships and is a gold medalist at the World Nomad Games.

== Career ==
Sapar is a member of the Military Unit 5451 of the National Guard of Kazakhstan and represents them in international and military sports competitions.

Sapar competed at the 2021 CIS Games held in Kazan, Tatarstan, Russia, where he won the silver medal in the 88 kg juniors category. At the 2023 Beach Sambo World Championships held in Juan Dolio, Dominican Republic, he won the silver medal in the 88 kg category. At the 2024 Asian and Oceanian Championships held in Macau, Sapar won the gold medal in the 98 kg category. At the 2025 World Beach Sambo Championships held in Singapore, he won a bronze medal in the +88 kg category.

At the 2026 Asian and Oceanian Championships held in Manila, Philippines, Sapar competed in the +98 kg category and won the silver medal. At the 2026 World Nomad Games, he won the gold medal in the +98 kg category.
