= Chulpan, Bizhbulyaksky District, Republic of Bashkortostan =

Chulpan Чулпан
- Village
- Location within Bashkortostan Location within Russia
- Coordinates: 53°41′N 54°21′E
- Country: Russia
- Region: Bashkortostan
- District: Bizhbulyaksky District
- Time zone: UTC+5:00

Chulpan (Russian: Чулпан; Bashkir: Сулпан, Sulpan) is a rural locality (a village) in Kenger-Meneuzovsky Selsoviet, Bizhbulyaksky District, Bashkortostan, Russia. The population was 121 as of 2010. There is 1 street.

== Geography ==
Chulpan is located 7 km east of Bizhbulyak (the district's administrative centre) by road. Barsh is the nearest rural locality.
