= 2024 World Nomad Games =

5th World Nomad Games
- Host city: Astana
- Country: Kazakhstan
- Motto: The Gathering of the Great Steppe (Kazakh: Ұлы дала дүбірі) (Note: Literally "The Rumble of the Great Steppe")
- Nations: 89
- Athletes: Over 2500
- Events: 21 ethnosport disciplines, 100+ cultural events, and a scientific conference
- Opening: 8 September 2024
- Closing: 13 September 2024
- Opened by: President of Kazakhstan Kassym-Jomart Tokayev

The 2024 World Nomad Games, (Note: Kazakh: 2024 Дүниежүзілік көшпенділер ойындары, Kyrgyz: 2024 Дүйнөлүк көчмөндөр оюндары, Russian: Всемирные игры кочевников 2024) officially known as the V World Nomad Games, (Note: Kazakh: V Дүниежүзілік көшпенділер ойындары, Kyrgyz: V Дүйнөлүк көчмөндөр оюндары, Russian: V Всемирные игры кочевников) was an international multi-sport event that was held between 8 and 13 September 2024 in Astana, Kazakhstan.

== Medal table ==
* Host nation (Kazakhstan)

Rank	Nation	Gold	Silver	Bronze	Total
1	Kazakhstan*	43	32	37	112
2	Kyrgyzstan	19	21	25	65
3	Russia	12	12	25	49
4	Uzbekistan	11	12	11	34
5	Turkey	2	2	2	6
6	Iran	1	3	9	13
7	Hungary	1	2	5	8
8	Turkmenistan	1	1	2	4
9	Romania	1	1	1	3
10	Poland	1	1	0	2
11	China	1	0	5	6
11	India	1	0	5	6
11	Moldova	1	0	5	6
14	France	1	0	1	2
14	Indonesia	1	0	1	2
16	Australia	1	0	0	1
16	Italy	1	0	0	1
16	Nigeria	1	0	0	1
19	Mongolia	0	5	9	14
20	Georgia	0	3	5	8
21	Azerbaijan	0	2	5	7
22	Canada	0	1	1	2
22	Ghana	0	1	1	2
24	Mexico	0	1	0	1
25	Tajikistan	0	0	6	6
26	Netherlands	0	0	4	4
27	Pakistan	0	0	3	3
28	Belarus	0	0	2	2
29	Estonia	0	0	1	1
29	Latvia	0	0	1	1
29	Slovakia	0	0	1	1
29	Thailand	0	0	1	1
29	Togo	0	0	1	1
Totals (33 entries)		100	100	175	375
