= 2016 World Nomad Games =

International multi-sport event

2nd World Nomad Games
- Host city: Cholpon-Ata, Kyrgyzstan
- Nations: 40
- Events: 23 sports
- Opening: 3 September 2016
- Closing: 8 September 2016
- Opened by: Almazbek Atambaev; President of Kyrgyzstan

The 2016 World Nomad Games was held in Cholpon-Ata, Kyrgyzstan from 3–8 September 2016 with 23 sports featured in the games. The program of the second edition included 23 kinds of ethnosport. 40 countries participated in this games.

== Sports ==
- Equestrian Sports (Horse Sports) (6): Horse Racing (At Chabysh / Jorgo salysh / Kunan Chabysh) + Horse Competitions (Kok-boru /Er enish / Cirit)
- Martial Arts Sports (Traditional Wrestling) (7): Mass-wrestling / Kazakh kuresh / Goresh / Gyulesh / Aba kurosh / Kyrgyz kurosh / Alysh
- Traditional Sports (8): Traditional Games (Ordo) + Horse Racing (Chong at chabysh) + Traditional Archers Bow (Hiking shooting/Horseback shooting / Mass bow range) + Traditional Hunting (Burkut saluu: "Undok", "Chyrga" / Dalba oynotuu / Taygan jarysh)
- Traditional Intellectual (2): Togyz Korgool / Mangala

== Medal table ==
Rank	Nation	Gold	Silver	Bronze	Total
1	Kyrgyzstan	25	25	29	79
2	Turkmenistan	15	3	6	24
3	Kazakhstan	12	13	13	38
4	Russia	12	5	10	27
5	Azerbaijan	4	4	7	15
6	Iran	2	5	11	18
7	Georgia	2	1	0	3
8	Uzbekistan	1	4	7	12
9	Bashkortostan	1	3	6	10
10	Tatarstan	1	2	2	5
11	Slovakia	1	2	0	3
12	Mongolia	1	1	6	8
13	Serbia	1	1	0	2
14	Hungary	1	0	4	5
15	Moldova	1	0	2	3
16	Turkey	1	0	0	1
17	Ukraine	0	4	7	11
18	Tajikistan	0	2	2	4
18	United States	0	2	2	4
20	Armenia	0	2	1	3
21	Ecuador	0	1	1	2
21	Poland	0	1	1	2
23	Lithuania	0	0	5	5
24	China	0	0	4	4
25	Argentina	0	0	2	2
25	Belarus	0	0	2	2
25	Latvia	0	0	2	2
25	South Korea	0	0	2	2
29	Afghanistan	0	0	1	1
29	Brazil	0	0	1	1
29	India	0	0	1	1
29	Norway	0	0	1	1
Totals (32 entries)		81	81	138	300
