= Chulpan, Urshaksky Selsoviet, Aurgazinsky District, Republic of Bashkortostan =

Chulpan Чулпан
- Village
- Location within Bashkortostan Location within Russia
- Coordinates: 54°12′N 55°39′E
- Country: Russia
- Region: Bashkortostan
- District: Aurgazinsky District
- Time zone: UTC+5:00

Chulpan (Russian: Чулпан; Bashkir: Сулпан, Sulpan) is a rural locality (a village) in Urshaksky Selsoviet, Aurgazinsky District, Bashkortostan, Russia. The population was 45 as of 2010.

== Geography ==
It is located 32 km from Tolbazy and 16 km from Staroabsalyamovo.
