= Bayaman Erkinbayev =

Kyrgyzstani lawmaker and parliamentary deputy

Bayaman Erkinbayev (Баяман Эркинбаев, c. 1967 - September 22, 2005) was a top Kyrgyzstani lawmaker and parliamentary deputy, who was the driving force behind the riots in southern Kyrgyzstan that led to the overthrow of President Askar Akayev on March 24, 2005. One of the richest businessmen in the country, he funded the Central Asian state's Socialist Party. He had announced his candidacy for the presidency in the July 2005 elections, but bowed down long before the vote, when his party supported former security chief and Bishkek mayor, Felix Kulov.

Starting out as a worker at a tobacco factory in his hometown of Osh in the south, Erkinbayev made his fame as a wrestler, and served in parliament for a decade. He went on to own "Kara Suu", Central Asia’s largest bazaar.

Erkinbayev was a key figure behind the March 2005 events, where around 2,000 of his martial arts trainees moved across the southern cities of Jalal-Abad, Osh, and Batken, capturing government sites, burning down police stations, and blocking key highways. The protests later moved to the capital, Bishkek, and ousted longtime President Askar Akayev from office on March 24. Erkinbayev gained much support by financing protests, and sending in martial arts trainees to lead the demonstrations. He was a devotee of Alysh, Kyrgyzstan’s answer to kung fu and was also the head of Kyrgyzstan's National Olympic Committee.

Erkinbayev was lauded as a hero in his hometown of Osh after the revolution, when some 20,000 people gathered in Osh’s main square to celebrate the regime’s fall. He was reported to exercise strong influence over small businesses in the Osh region, and was widely rumoured to be associated with the criminal world. Erkinbayev operated at the turbulent intersection where politics, business, sports and, sometimes, crime meet in post-Soviet Central Asia. The Kyrgyz parliament, however, had refused prosecutors' attempts to strip him of legal immunity.

Erkinbayev survived an assassination attempt on April 28, 2005, in which he was shot at from a car, and sported a bandage over his nose. He believed that the motive was political, but also felt that it could have been an attempt to wrestle control of his business empire. On September 22, 2005, however, Erkinbayev sustained bullet wounds to his neck and chest, when he was attacked by unidentified assailants from behind some bushes after arriving home by car late that day. He died in hospital, aged 38.
