= 2018 World Nomad Games =

Multisport event in Kyrgyzstan

3rd World Nomad Games
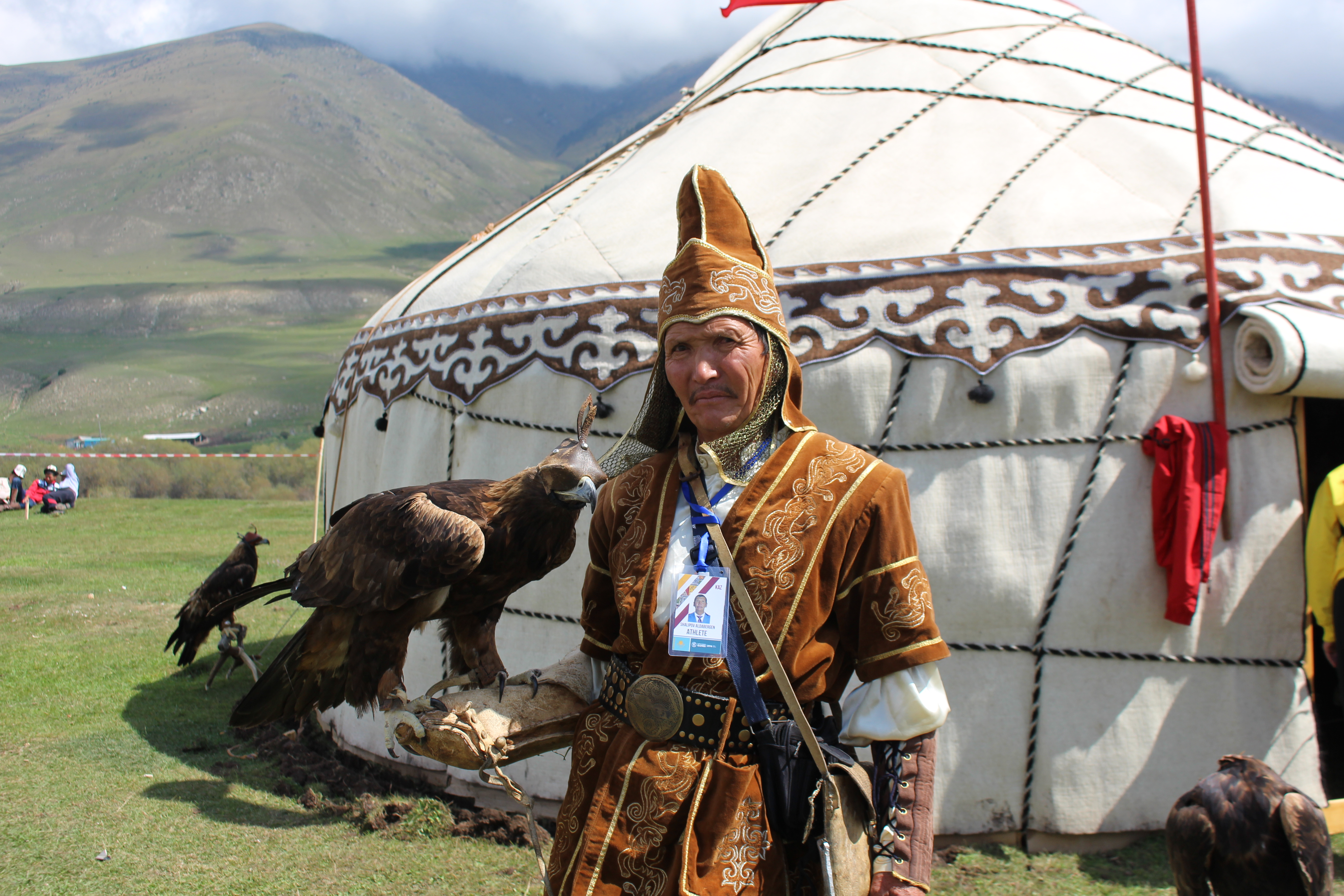
- Host city: Cholpon-Ata, Kyrgyzstan
- Motto: United Force, United in Spirit
- Nations: 82
- Athletes: Over 2000
- Events: 37 sports
- Opening: 2 September 2018
- Closing: 8 September 2018
- Opened by: President of Kyrgyzstan Sooronbay Jeenbekov

The 2018 World Nomad Games (Kyrgyz: Дүйнөлүк көчмөндөр оюндары 2018, Russian: Всемирные игры кочевников 2018) is the 3rd international sports competition organized in ethnic sports. It was held in Cholpon-Ata, Kyrgyzstan from 2–8 September 2018 with 37 sports being featured in the games. Featured sports included eagle hunting, bone throwing and kok-boru. The opening ceremony was attended by President of Kyrgyzstan Sooronbay Jeenbekov, Turkish President Recep Tayyip Erdogan, Hungarian Prime Minister Viktor Orbán and Kazakh President Nursultan Nazarbayev, Azerbaijani President Ilham Aliyev and Uzbek President Shavkat Mirziyoyev. It was announced during the festival that Kyrgyzstan would not be hosting the games in 2020, saying that Turkey would be hosting the games that year.The 4th World Nomad Games were ultimately postponed twice due to the COVID-19 pandemic and were held in İznik, Turkey, in September 2022.

37 sports events were held, with 27 countries gaining medals.

== Sports ==
1. Kyrgyz Kurosh
2. Kazakh Kuresi
3. Goresh
4. Kyrgyz Kurosh
5. Kazakh Kuresi
6. Kurash
7. Gushtini Milli Kamarbandi
8. Mongol Bokh
9. Mass-wrestling
10. Pahlavani
11. Gyulesh
12. Ashyrtmaly Aba Gureshi (Aba kurosh)
13. Ssireum
14. Sumo
15. Alysh
16. Great Nomad Wrestling
17. Sambo
18. Armwrestling
19. Tug of War
20. Traditional Archery (Korea)
21. Traditional Archery (Kyrgyzstan)
22. Traditional Archery (Turkey)
23. Traditional Horseback Archery (Mounted Archery) (Turkey and Kyrgyzstan)
24. Traditional Distance Shooting Archery (Hungary)
25. Kok Boru
26. Er Enish
27. Endurance
28. Flat Racing
29. At Chabysh
30. Kunan Chabysh
31. Zhorgo Salysh
32. Byshty Zhorgo
33. BURKUT SALUU
34. TAIGAN ZHARYSH
35. DALBA
36. Mangala
37. Oware
38. Togyz Korgool
39. Ordo
40. Cirit (Cancelled)

== Medals ==
Rank	yes	Gold	Silver	Bronze	Total
1	Kyrgyzstan (KGZ)	40	32	31	103
2	Kazakhstan (KAZ)	18	24	30	72
3	Russia (RUS)	17	12	27	56
4	Turkmenistan (TKM)	10	5	12	27
5	Uzbekistan (UZB)	7	8	18	33
6	Hungary (HUN)	4	4	4	12
7	Iran (IRI)	4	3	5	12
8	Ukraine (UKR)	3	3	3	9
9	Mongolia (MGL)	2	4	11	17
10	Turkey (TUR)	2	1	3	6
11	Antigua and Barbuda (ATG)	2	0	1	3
12	Azerbaijan (AZE)	1	6	8	15
13	Tajikistan (TJK)	1	2	2	5
14	China (CHN)	1	1	4	6
15	Bulgaria (BUL)	1	0	1	2
15	Germany (GER)	1	0	1	2
15	Serbia (SRB)	1	0	1	2
15	United Arab Emirates (UAE)	1	0	1	2
19	Latvia (LAT)	1	0	0	1
19	Lithuania (LTU)	1	0	0	1
21	Georgia (GEO)	0	2	3	5
22	Ghana (GHA)	0	2	0	2
23	United States (USA)	0	1	2	3
24	Estonia (EST)	0	1	1	2
25	Argentina (ARG)	0	1	0	1
25	Poland (POL)	0	1	0	1
27	Moldova (MDA)	0	0	2	2
28	Armenia (ARM)	0	0	1	1
28	India (IND)	0	0	1	1
28	Japan (JPN)	0	0	1	1
28	Netherlands (NED)	0	0	1	1
28	Singapore (SIN)	0	0	1	1
Totals (32 entries)		118	113	176	407
