= Chulpan, Yanaulsky District, Republic of Bashkortostan =

Chulpan Чулпан
- Village
- Location within Bashkortostan Location within Russia
- Coordinates: 56°20′N 55°03′E
- Country: Russia
- Region: Bashkortostan
- District: Yanaulsky District
- Time zone: UTC+5:00

Chulpan (Russian: Чулпан; Bashkir: Сулпан, Sulpan) is a rural locality (a village) in Istyaksky Selsoviet, Yanaulsky District, Bashkortostan, Russia. The population was 56 as of 2010. There is 1 street.

== Geography ==
Chulpan is located 16 km northeast of Yanaul (the district's administrative centre) by road. Stary Kuyuk is the nearest rural locality.
