= Nureyevo =

Nureyevo Нуреево
- Selo
- Location within Bashkortostan Location within Russia
- Coordinates: 54°47′N 54°12′E
- Country: Russia
- Region: Bashkortostan
- District: Sharansky District
- Time zone: UTC+5:00

Nureyevo (Russian: Нуреево; Bashkir: Нөрәй, Nöräy) is a rural locality (a selo) and the administrative centre of Nureyevsky Selsoviet, Sharansky District, Bashkortostan, Russia. The population was 331 as of 2010. There are four streets.

== Geography ==
Nureyevo is located 26 km southeast of Sharan (the district's administrative centre) by road. Izimka is the nearest rural locality.
