= Chulpan, Miyakinsky District, Republic of Bashkortostan =

Chulpan Чулпан
- Village
- Location within Bashkortostan Location within Russia
- Coordinates: 53°28′N 54°41′E
- Country: Russia
- Region: Bashkortostan
- District: Miyakinsky District
- Time zone: UTC+5:00

Chulpan (Russian: Чулпан; Bashkir: Сулпан, Sulpan) is a rural locality (a village) in Satyyevsky Selsoviet, Miyakinsky District, Bashkortostan, Russia. The population was 24 as of 2010. There is 1 street.

== Geography ==
Chulpan is located 24 km south of Kirgiz-Miyaki (the district's administrative centre) by road. Bayazitovo and Satyevo are the nearest rural localities.
