= Chulpan, Salavatsky District, Republic of Bashkortostan =

Chulpan Чулпан
- Village
- Location within Bashkortostan Location within Russia
- Coordinates: 55°17′N 58°06′E
- Country: Russia
- Region: Bashkortostan
- District: Salavatsky District
- Time zone: UTC+5:00

Chulpan (Russian: Чулпан; Bashkir: Сулпан, Sulpan) is a rural locality (a village) in Yangatausky Selsoviet, Salavatsky District, Bashkortostan, Russia. The population was 376 as of 2010. There are 12 streets.

== Geography ==
Chulpan is located 14 km north of Maloyaz (the district's administrative centre) by road. Yangantau is the nearest rural locality.
