= Chulpan, Buzdyaksky District, Republic of Bashkortostan =

Chulpan Чулпан
- Village
- Location within Bashkortostan Location within Russia
- Coordinates: 54°34′N 54°29′E
- Country: Russia
- Region: Bashkortostan
- District: Buzdyaksky District
- Time zone: UTC+5:00

Chulpan (Russian: Чулпан; Bashkir: Сулпан, Sulpan) is a rural locality (a village) in Urtakulsky Selsoviet, Buzdyaksky District, Bashkortostan, Russia. The population was 76 as of 2010. There is 1 street.

== Geography ==
Chulpan is located 6 km west of Buzdyak (the district's administrative centre) by road. Buzdyak is the nearest rural locality.
