= Chulpan, Yermekeyevsky District, Republic of Bashkortostan =

Chulpan Чулпан
- Village
- Location within Bashkortostan Location within Russia
- Coordinates: 53°47′N 53°38′E
- Country: Russia
- Region: Bashkortostan
- District: Yermekeyevsky District
- Time zone: UTC+5:00

Chulpan (Russian: Чулпан; Bashkir: Сулпан, Sulpan) is a rural locality (a village) in Tarkazinsky Selsoviet, Yermekeyevsky District, Bashkortostan, Russia. The population was 12 as of 2010. There is 1 street.

== Geography ==
Chulpan is located 40 km south of Yermekeyevo (the district's administrative centre) by road. Cheryomushki is the nearest rural locality.
