= Chulpan 2-y =

Chulpan 2-y Чулпан 2-й
- Village
- Location within Bashkortostan Location within Russia
- Coordinates: 54°54′N 54°42′E
- Country: Russia
- Region: Bashkortostan
- District: Blagovarsky District
- Time zone: UTC+5:00

Chulpan 2-y (Russian: Чулпан 2-й; Bashkir: 2-се Сулпан, 2-se Sulpan) is a rural locality (a village) in Kucherbayevsky Selsoviet, Blagovarsky District, Bashkortostan, Russia. The population was 134 as of 2010. There is 1 street.

== Geography ==
Chulpan 2-y is located 43 km northwest of Yazykovo (the district's administrative centre) by road. Novoabzanovo is the nearest rural locality.
