= Er Enish =

Kyrgyz equestrian sport

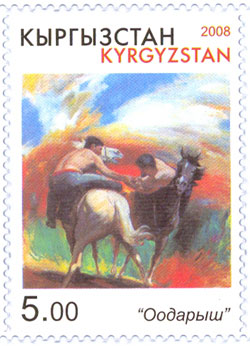
Kirghiz stamp featuring an oodarysh match

Er Enish (Kyrgyz : Эр эңиш), or Oodarysh, is a traditional Kyrgyz equestrian sport. It is a form of wrestling from horseback.

The rules allow dangerous holds, such as holding the flanks, arm muscles and joints. The horse's skill is as important as the rider's in this kind of wrestling. Horses need to be heavy, strong and biddable. Er Enish is one of the sports featured in the World Nomad Games.

== Rules ==
In official competitions, participants must be at least 19 years old and be medically certified; 18-year-olds are permitted if they are in excellent physical shape. Competitors are divided into three categories according to weight: up to 70 kg, 70 to 90 kg, and more than 90 kg.

Er Enish needs flat, clear ground. The sport is played in a 30 m diameter circle, under the supervision of a mounted referee. Participants wear a costume that leaves them naked to the waist.

An Er Enish bout lasts an average of six minutes, but the game stops if a horse or wrestler is hurt. In this case, a 2-minute break is allowed to the injured wrestler for a medical examination. If he does not resume wrestling after this time, his opponent wins the bout. During the match, the referee awards points to the wrestlers for each hold or fault that takes place. At the end of the game, the total number of points decides the winner; if the score is equal, an extra 2-minute round takes place as a tiebreaker.

Some moves are not allowed, such as kicks, punches, using a whip, holding onto the face or hair, finger twisting, and so on.

== Scoring ==
Points are awarded as follows:-

- If a wrestler keeps a hold on the opponent's horse for 3 seconds, he earns 1 point.
- If a wrestler keeps a hold on his opponent for 3 seconds, he earns 1 point.
- If a wrestler manages to unbalance his opponent, so the opponent has to hold onto his horse to avoid falling, he earns 2 points.
- If a wrestler manages to hold his opponent's hand behind his back without unseating him, he earns 2 points.
- If a wrestler tries to avoid his opponent's hold, he gets a warning for passiveness, and his opponent earns 1 point.
- If a wrestler holds the opponent's horse by the reins, he gets a warning, and his opponent earns 1 point.
- If a wrestler causes his opponent to fall from his horse, he earns 4 points.

The game can also be played in teams, in which case the total cumulative score of each team decides its ranking in the competition.

== Origins ==
Er Enish is mentioned in the Epic of Manas.
