= Shagai =

Animal ankle bones used for games and divination

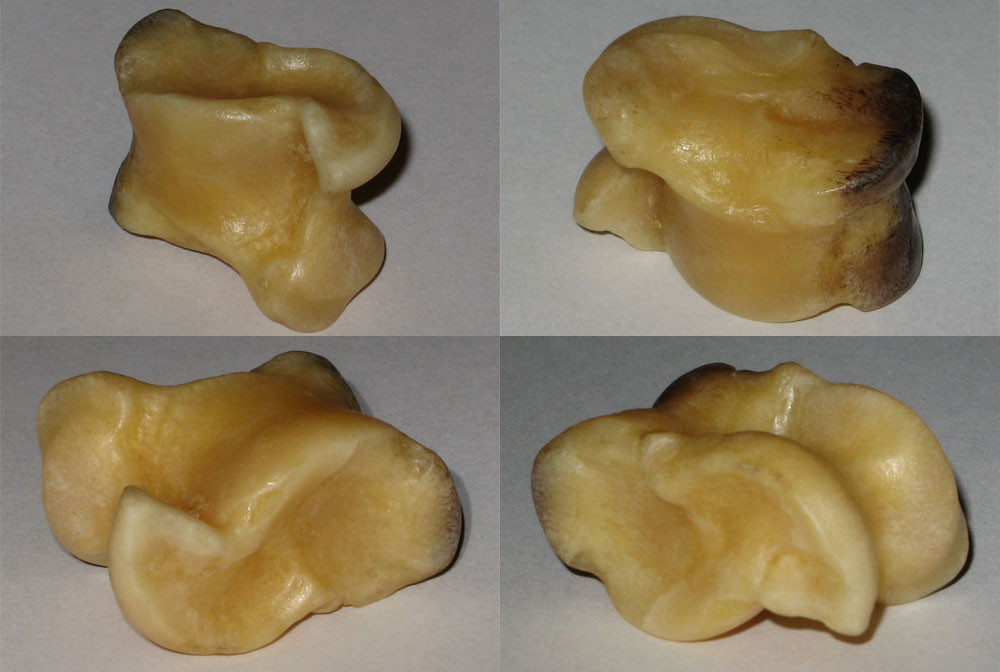
Names given to possible positions of a sheepbone shagai. From top left clockwise: Camel, Horse, Goat, Sheep

Shagai (Mongolian: шагай, pronounced [ʃɑˈʁɛː]), chükö (Kyrgyz: чүкө, pronounced [tʃyˈkœ]), asyk/ashyk/oshuq (Kazakh: асық, pronounced [ɑˈsəq]; Turkish: aşık; Uyghur: ھوشۇق; Tajik: ошуқ, pronounced [ɒʃuq]), gachuha (Manchu : ᡤᠠᠴᡠᡥᠠ) refers to the astragalus of the ankle of a sheep or goat. The bones are collected and used for traditional games and fortune-telling throughout Central Asia, and games involving the ankle bones may also be referred to by the name of the bones. They may be painted bright colours. Such bones have been used throughout history, and are thought to be the first forms of dice. In English language sources, shagai may be referred to as "ankle bones", and playing with shagai is sometimes called ankle bone shooting.

Shagai games are especially popular during the Mongolian summer holiday of Naadam. In shagai dice, the rolled shagai generally land on one of four sides: horse, camel, sheep or goat. A fifth side, cow, is possible on uneven ground.

Mongolians still exchange shagai today as tokens of friendship. The shagai may be kept in a little pouch.

In addition, Mongolians (usually male) also collect wolf shagai (in this case the calcaneus rather than the astragalus), which are viewed as good-luck tokens, presumably due to the bone's superficial resemblance to the male genitalia.

== Divination ==
In fortunetelling, four shagai are rolled on the ground; the two convex sides, horse and camel, are considered lucky, with horse being the luckiest. The sides with concave indents, sheep and goat, are deemed unlucky; rolling all four sides on one throw is considered indicative of very good fortune.

== Games ==
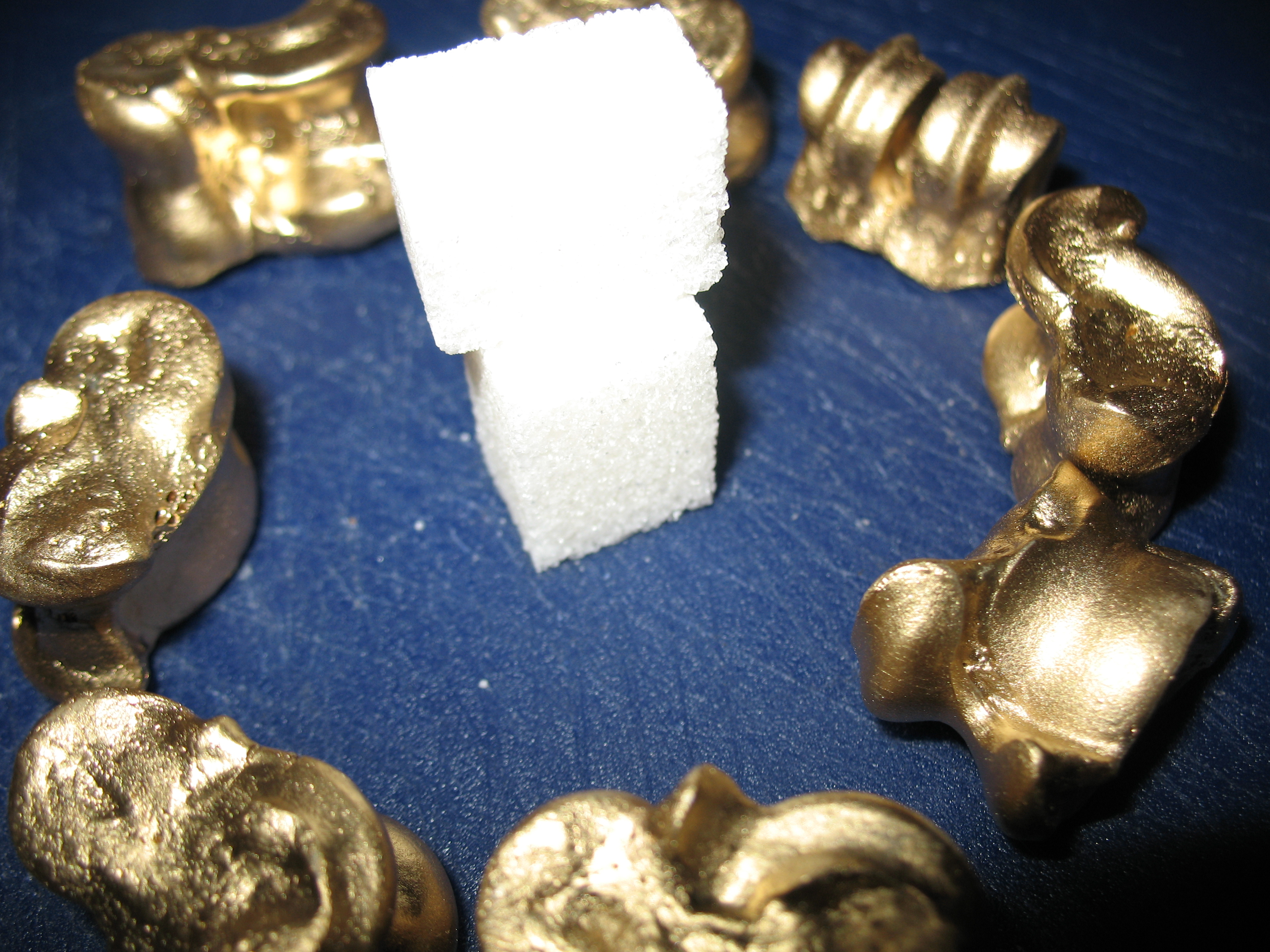
Modernization of the shagai in Tyva by Kuzhuget Ali, Tuvan: Кажык

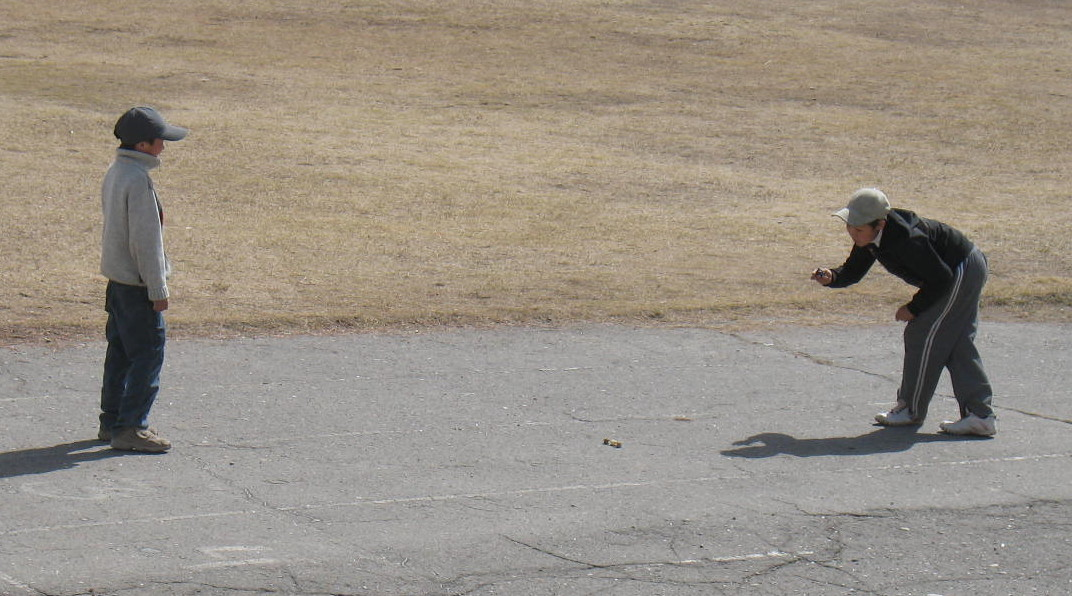
Kyrgyz boys playing chükö-based game for fun in the stadium in Naryn, Kyrgyzstan.

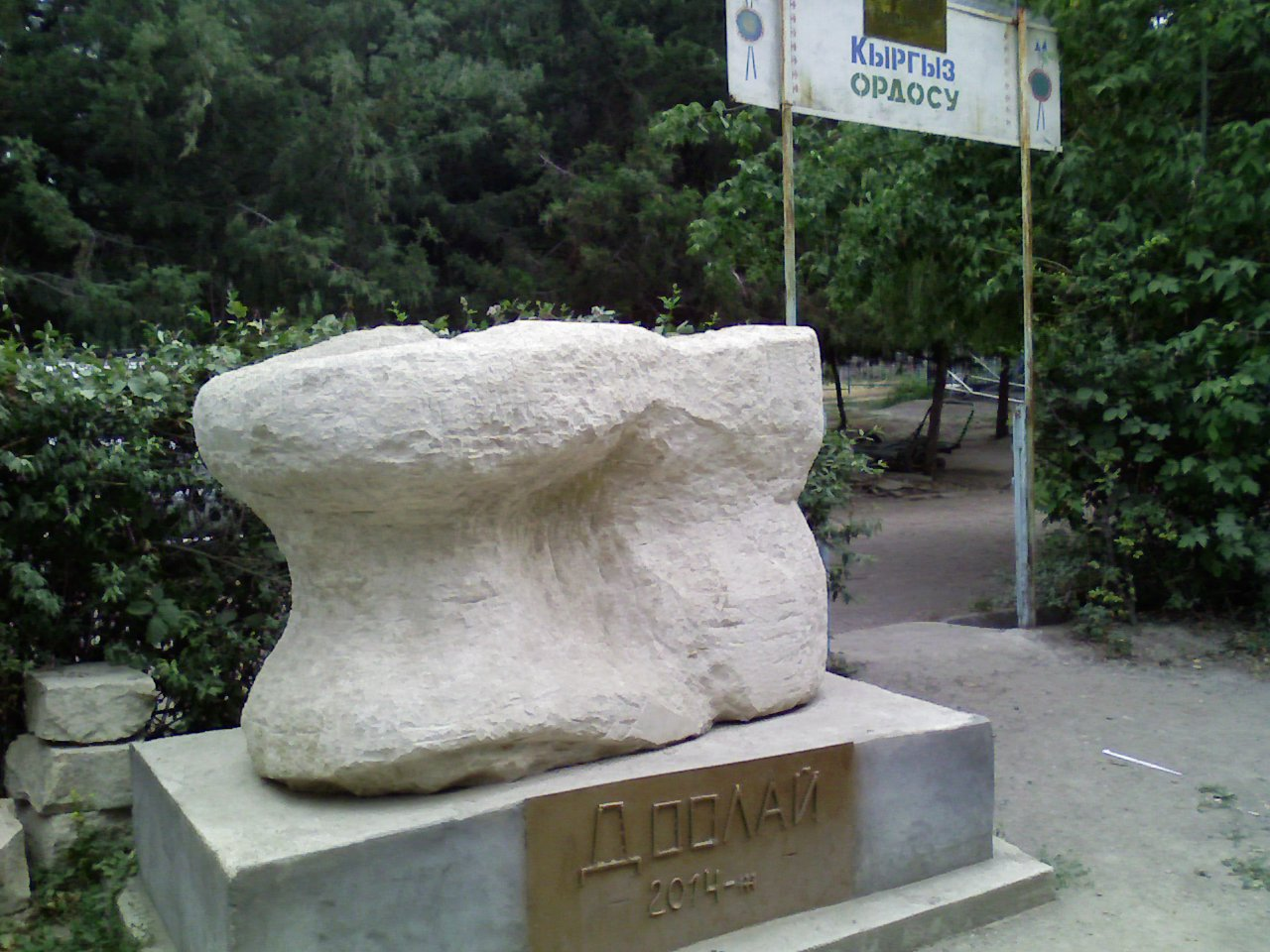
Monument at the site for the game in Osh, Kyrgyzstan.

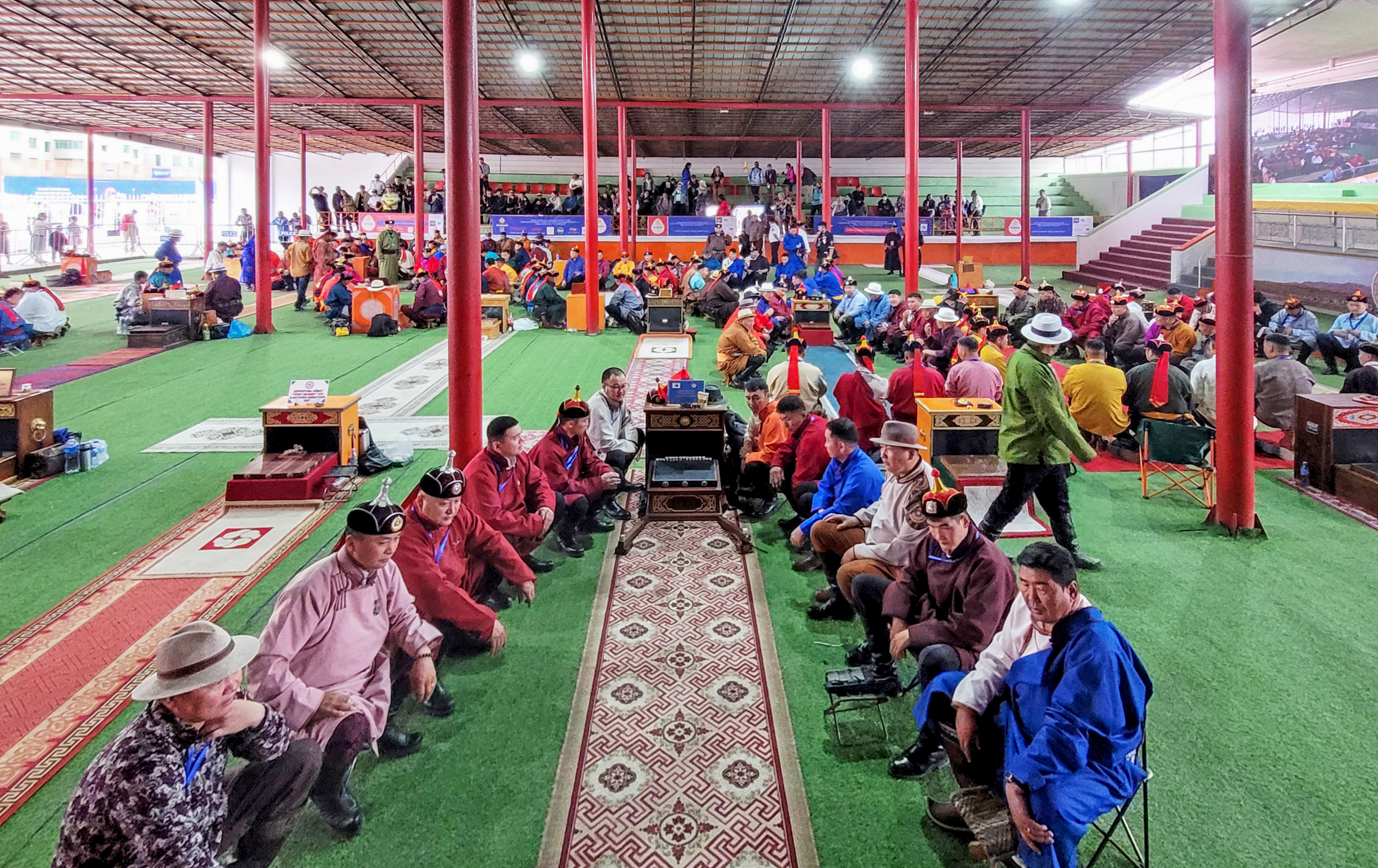
Shagai game at Naadam festival in Ulan Bator, Mongolia.

A large variety of traditional Mongolian games are played using the shagai pieces. Depending on the game, the anklebones may be tossed like dice, flicked like marbles, shot at with arrows, caught in the hands, or simply collected according to the roll of a die. In many games, the side on which a tossed piece lands (horse, sheep, camel, or goat) is significant.

For one of the most popular games, there are even public tournaments held, most commonly played during the traditional Naadam festival. In this game, pieces are flicked with the middle finger of one hand, along a wooden board (khashlaga = fence rail) held in the other hand. The goal is to hit a target piece over a distance of about 10 m.

The astragalus-based games are very popular in Kyrgyzstan and amongst the Kyrgyz in the world.

An ankle bone shooting game was played under the name of Ordo at the 2014 World Nomad Games.

Some other common games are:

Horse race
A very common game, usually played with two, but also with more players. Each player flicks one piece (his "horse") in turn along a sequence of stationary pieces representing the race course.

Birthing camels
On each turn, a player tosses all the pieces to the ground. The goal is then to use the "sheep" pieces to knock the "camel" pieces also into sheep position.

Cat's game
A number of "sheep" (or "goats") are lined up two-by-two. The player then throws another object (often a piece of chain) up into the air and catches it again. In the short time while the object is floating, the task is to pick up one piece with the same hand, but not to disturb the others.

Full toss
Each of two to four players in turn tosses all the pieces. Depending on the number of horses and/or camels landed, the player can collect pieces from the pool, or has to add some. Winner is the player who has collected the most once the pool is empty.

Open catch
Using ten or more pieces, each player in turn places all of them in one hand and tosses them up into the air. Then he tries to catch as many as possible with the back of the same hand. The caught pieces are tossed up again, and as many as possible caught in a fist this time. The caught ones are collected by the player. Winner is who has collected the most pieces once the pool is empty.

Twelve years
Two players in turn toss two pieces like dice for twelve rounds (corresponding to the twelve-year cycle of the traditional calendar), counting a point for each horse landed. If no player reaches 12 points, the game restarts, otherwise the higher score wins.

Tossing three shagai
Any number of players take turns tossing three pieces like dice. Three pieces landing on the same side score two points, two sames give one point. Winner is who first reaches a predetermined number of points.

The four shagai
Players take turns tossing four pieces. All four landing on different sides scores eight points, four sames give four points, and two pairs give two points. If a player manages to grab all pieces of a four sames throw (by any player), they also get the score of that throw. Winner is who first gets ahead of all others by a predetermined margin.

Four animals
The pieces are divided into four groups, representing herds of different animals as of which side is turned upwards. Players take turns tossing one extra piece like a dice, collecting one from the herd of the type thrown, or putting one back if the respective herd is empty. Once all four herds are depleted, the player who has collected the most pieces wins.

== Other uses ==
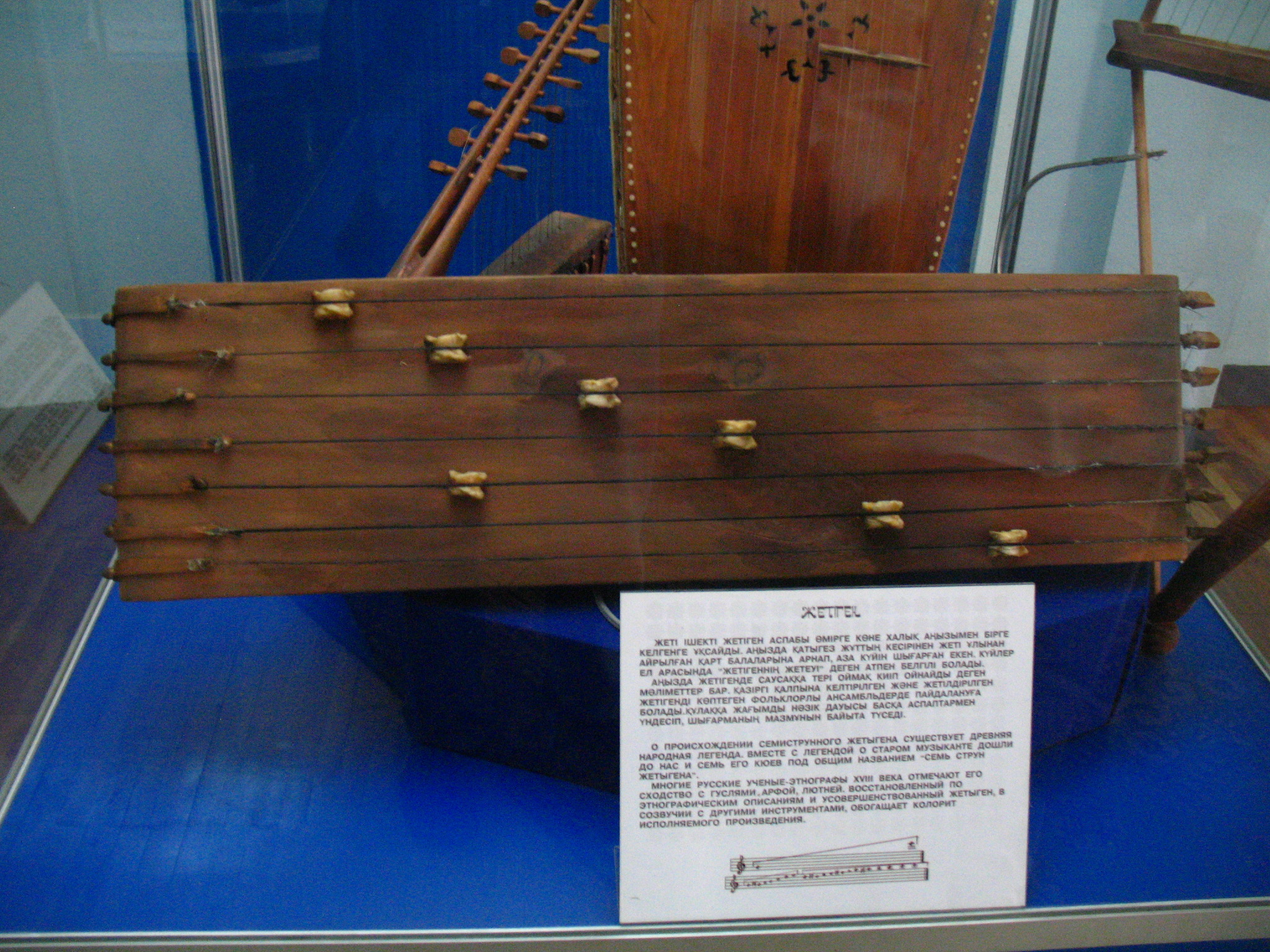
The jetigen, a Kazakh national musical instrument, uses asyk to set the notes of the strings.

Another use of shagai, besides in games and for divination, is as part of musical instruments, such as the Kazakh jetigen, a relative of the Mongolian yatga.

== See also ==
- Knucklebones
