= Alysh =

Central Asian folk wrestling

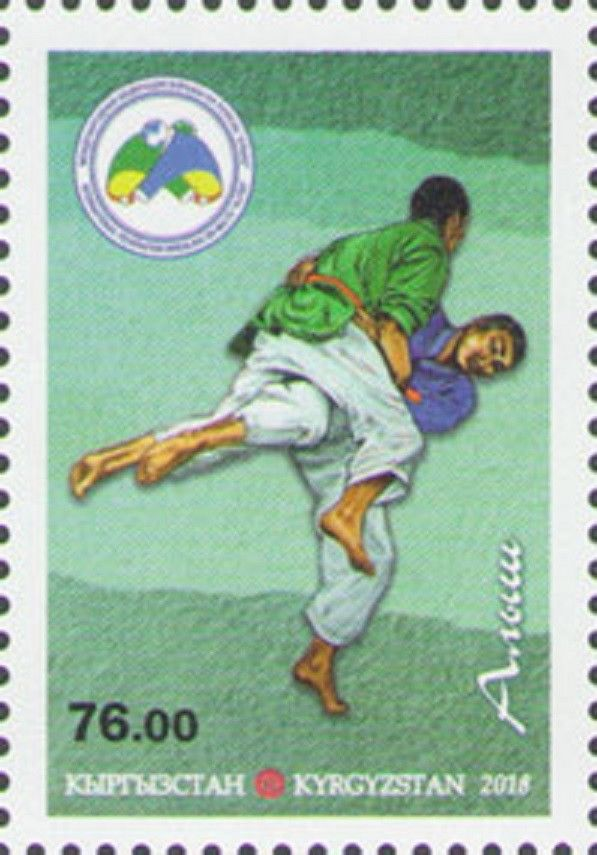
Alysh on a 2018 stamp of Kyrgyzstan

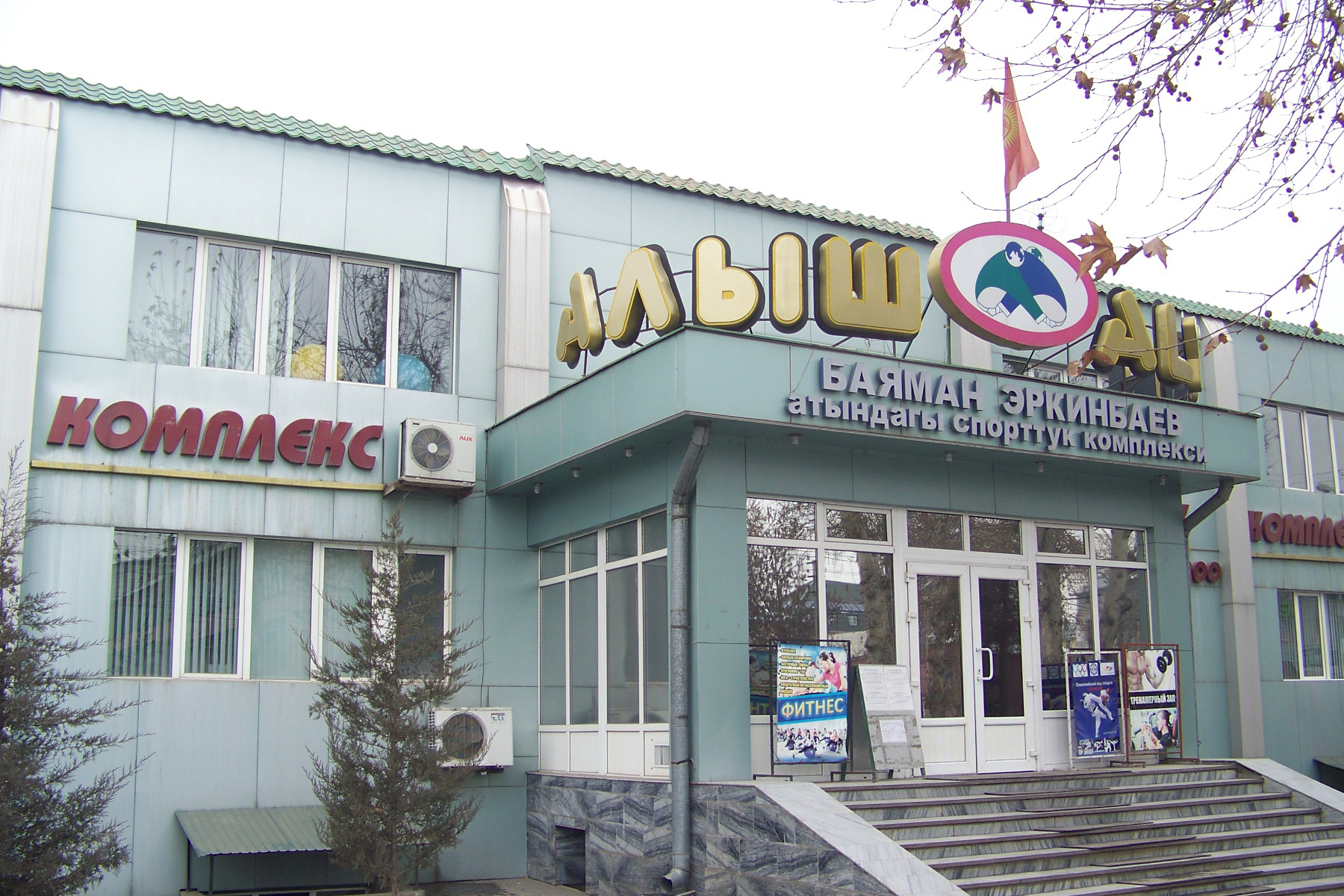
Sports center "Alysh" in Kyrgyzstan

Alysh (Kyrgyz: Алыш) is a Turkic term for Central Asian folk wrestling or "belt wrestling" regulated by United World Wrestling.

Alysh is an upright wrestling style. Competitors wear trousers, jackets and belts, and must hold on to their opponents' belts at all times. Their objective is to throw their opponents onto the mat. Throws are given scores between 1 and 6, based on what part of the opponent lands on the mat. The first player to win 6 points wins the match. Since 2008, Alysh is recognized by FILA, the world governing body for wrestling (the United World Wrestling (UWW) predecessor) as "wrestling alysh".

The development of the involvement of sports clubs with illegal drug traffic in South Kyrgyzstan is largely associated with IFWA and its former president Bayaman Erkinbayev. Erkinbaev also became a member of parliament in Kyrgyzstan in 2005. He was assassinated in September of the same year.

== Notable belt wrestlers ==
- Gregory Rudelson (born 1988), Israeli judoka and belt wrestler

== See also ==
- Köräş, a Tatar wrestling style
- Kurash, an Uzbek wrestling style
- Ssireum, a Korean wrestling style
