= Cholpon-Ata =

Cholpon-Ata Чолпон-Ата (Kyrgyz)
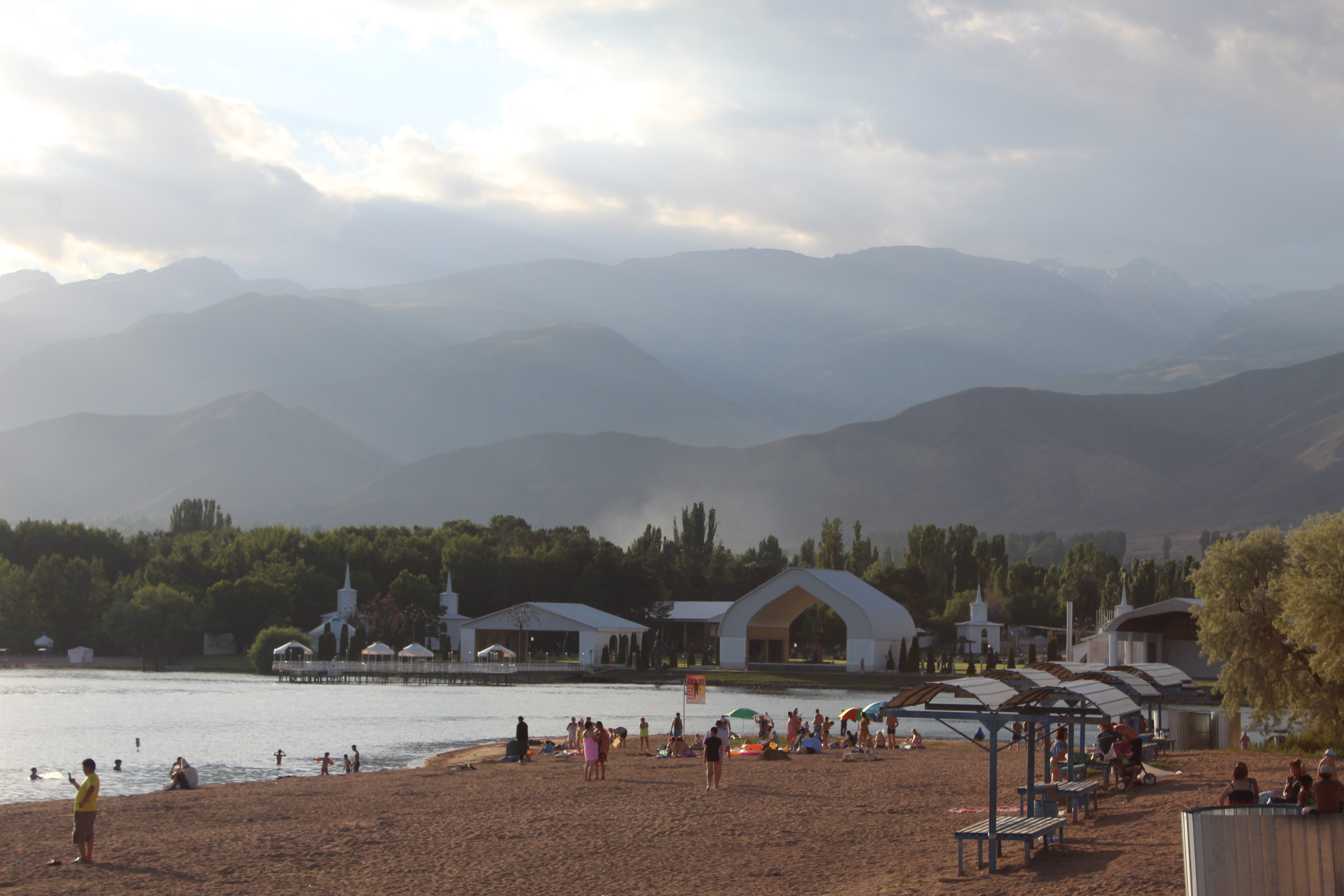
- Rukh Ordo complex at Cholpon-Ata

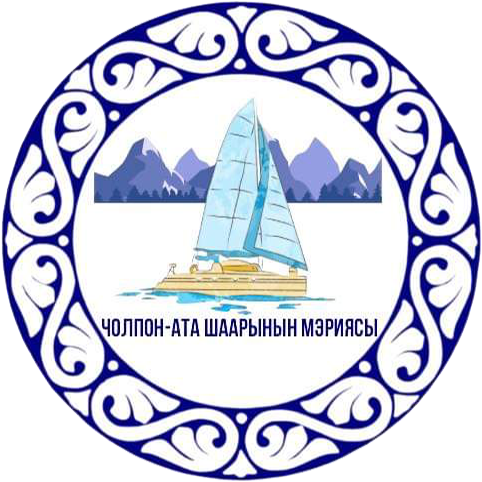
- Flag Seal

- Location in Kyrgyzstan
- Coordinates: 42°39′N 77°05′E
- Country: Kyrgyzstan
- Region: Issyk-Kul
- District: Issyk-Kul
- Elevation: 1,633 m (5,359 ft)

Population (2023)
  - Total: 12,648
- Time zone: UTC+6 (KGT)

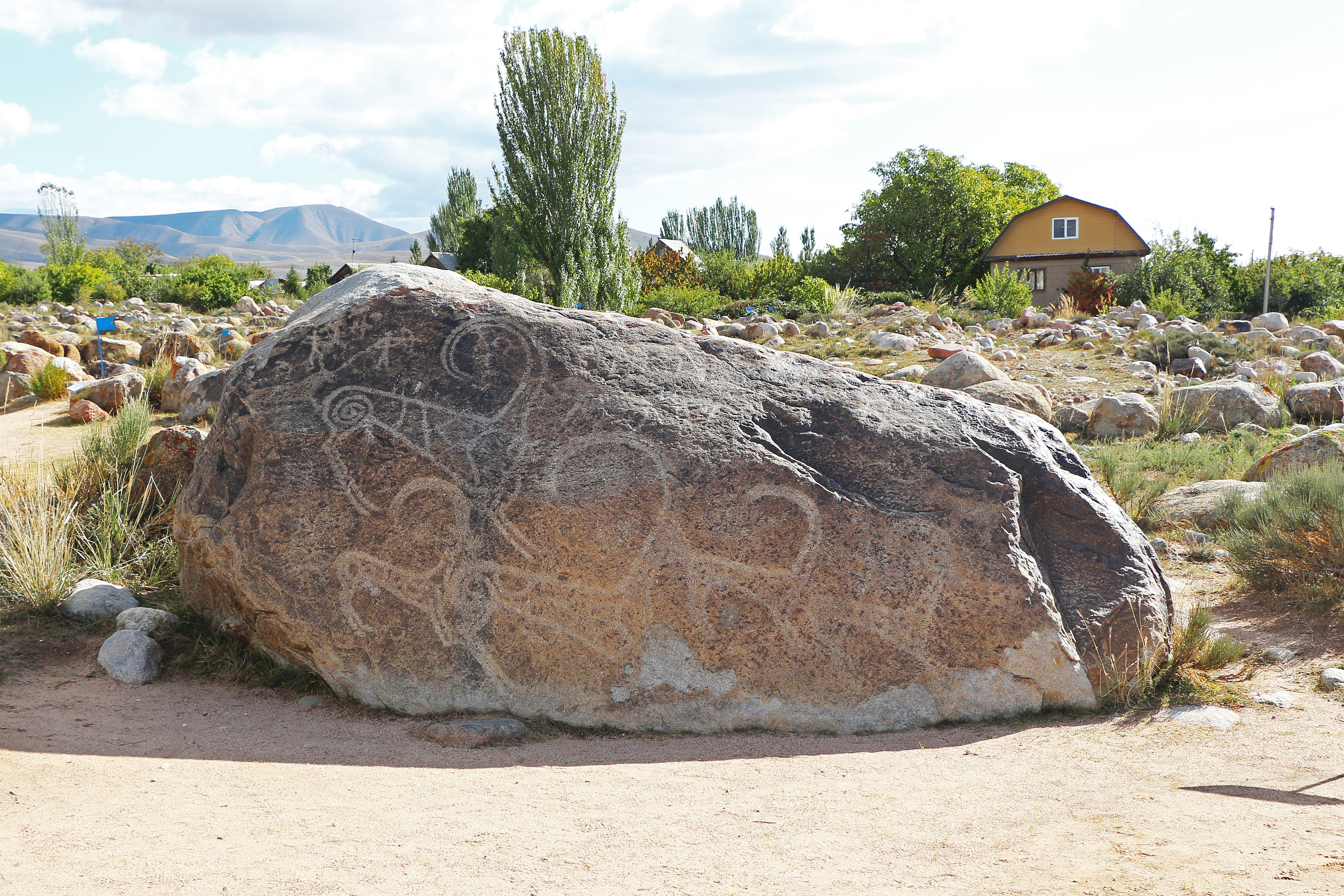
A boulder-strewn slope at Cholpon-Ata has numerous examples of petroglyphs, some showing people hunting animals which are now extinct or scarce in the area

Cholpon-Ata (Note: Kyrgyz: Чолпон-Ата, IPA: [t͡ɕʰoɫpʰón‿ɑtʰɑ́]; lit. 'Venus-Father', the name of a mythological protecting spirit) is a resort town on the northern shore of Lake Issyk-Kul in Kyrgyzstan with a population of 14,237 (2021). It is the administrative center of the Issyk-Kul District of Issyk-Kul Region; this district occupies most of the lake's north shore. To the west along highway A363 is Tamchy and to the east is Bosteri.

The town contains numerous large and small sanatoria, hotels and guesthouses to accommodate the many visitors who descend upon the lake in summer. During the Soviet era it was much frequented by vacationers brought here in organized mass tours from other parts of the USSR. Holidaymakers now usually visit on their own or in small groups and originate mainly from Kyrgyzstan, Kazakhstan, Uzbekistan and Russia with some tourists from other countries. Attracting more demanding foreign tourists will require upgrading of the existing facilities, but the location is certainly attractive. The view of the imposing alpine ranges of the Tian Shan across the lake is impressive. There is a local museum and an open-air site with about 2000 petroglyphs dating from 800 BC to 1200AD.

The first three World Nomad Games were held in Cholpon-Ata, in 2014, 2016, and 2018.

== Population ==
Historical population
Year	Pop.	±% p.a.
1970	4,805	—
1979	7,221	+4.63%
1989	9,669	+2.96%
1999	8,851	−0.88%
2009	10,525	+1.75%
2021	14,237	+2.55%
Note: resident population; Sources:

== Climate ==
Climate data for Cholpon-Ata (1991–2020)
Month	Jan	Feb	Mar	Apr	May	Jun	Jul	Aug	Sep	Oct	Nov	Dec	Year
Daily mean °C (°F)	−1.6 (29.1)	−0.7 (30.7)	3.2 (37.8)	8.3 (46.9)	12.3 (54.1)	16.1 (61.0)	18.5 (65.3)	18.2 (64.8)	15.0 (59.0)	9.5 (49.1)	4.4 (39.9)	0.5 (32.9)	8.6 (47.6)
Source: NOAA

== Transportation ==
The city is served by Cholpon-Ata Airport, with flights on one commercial airline.

== Twin towns ==
- Zugló, Hungary
- Shusha, Azerbaijan
