= Chenne =

Chenne is an Indian given name. Also it may refer to:

- Chenne Mane, game
- Chenne Kothapalle, village
- List of aircraft (D)#de Chenne
- Chennes
