= Malaysian ringgit =

Official currency of Malaysia

Ringgit Malaysia (Malay); ريڠݢيت مليسيا (Jawi)
- Currently issued Malaysian ringgit notes and coins, in use since 2012

ISO 4217
- Code: MYR (numeric: 458)
- Subunit: 0.01

Units of account
- Plural: The language(s) of this currency do(es) not have a morphological plural distinction.
- Symbol: RM
- Subunit
- 1/100: sen
- Nickname
- sen: kupang (1/10 subunit, notably in Kedah and northern Peninsular Malaysia)

Denominations
- Banknotes
- Freq. used: RM1, RM5, RM10, RM20, RM50, RM100
- Rarely used: RM2 (discontinued, still legal tender); RM60, RM600 (commemorative)
- Coins
- Freq. used: 5, 10, 20, 50 sen
- Rarely used: 1 sen (still legal tender)

Demographics
- Date of introduction: 12 June 1967
- Replaced: Malaya and British Borneo dollar
- User(s): Malaysia

Issuance
- Central bank: Central Bank of Malaysia
- Website: www.bnm.gov.my
- Mint: Royal Mint of Malaysia

Valuation
- Inflation: 1.6% (2026)
- Source: Department of Statistics, Malaysia

The Malaysian ringgit ((/ˈrɪŋɡɪt/, Malaysian: [ˈriŋget]); plural: ringgit; symbol: RM; currency code: MYR; Malay name: Ringgit Malaysia; formerly the Malaysian dollar) is the currency of Malaysia. Issued by the Central Bank of Malaysia, it is divided into 100 cents (Malay: sen).

== Etymology ==
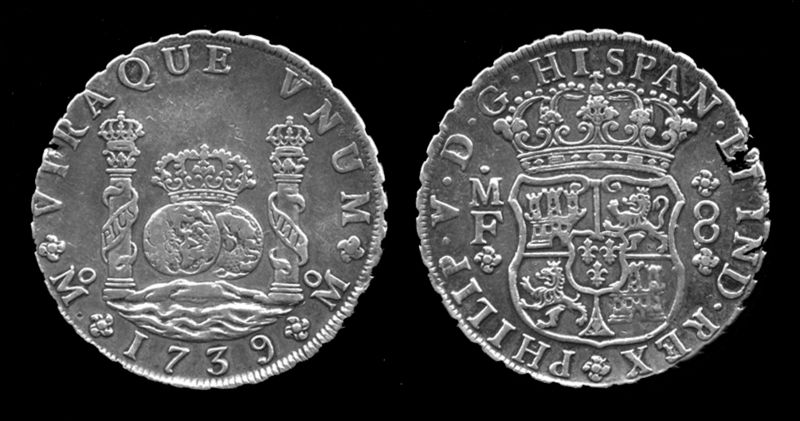
18th-century Spanish dollar with milled edges (jagged or "beringgit")

The word ringgit is an obsolete term for "jagged" in the Malay language. The word was originally used to refer to serrated edges. The first European coins to circulate widely in the region were Spanish "pieces of eight" or "cob", their crude appearance resembling stones, hence the word jagged. The availability and circulation of this Spanish currency were due to the Spanish controlling nearby Philippines.

An early printed source, the Dictionary of the Malayan Language from 1812 had already referred to the ringgit as a unit of money.

In modern usage, ringgit is used almost solely for the currency. Due to the common heritage of the three modern currencies, the Singapore dollar and the Brunei dollar are also called ringgit in Malay (currencies such as the US and Australian dollars are translated as dolar), although nowadays the Singapore dollar is more commonly called dolar in Malay. To differentiate between the three currencies, the Malaysian currency is referred to as Ringgit Malaysia, hence the official abbreviation and currency symbol RM. Internationally, the ISO 4217 currency code for Malaysian ringgit is MYR.

The Malay names ringgit and sen were officially adopted as the sole official names on 28 August 1975. Previously they had been known officially as dollars and cents in English and ringgit and sen in Malay, and in some parts of the country this usage continues. In the northern states of Peninsular Malaysia, denominations of 10 sen are called kupang in Northern Malay and called pua̍t (鏺/鈸) in Penang Hokkien which is thought to be derived from the Thai word baht. e.g. 50 sen is lima kupang in Malay or samah in the Kelantan dialect and gōo-pua̍t (五鏺/鈸) in Hokkien. The Tamil speaking communities in Malaysia use veḷḷi (வெள்ளி) meaning "silver" in Tamil to refer to ringgit, while for sen, the word kācu (காசு) is used, from which the English word cash, as in Chinese copper cash coins, is derived.

== History ==
=== Before independence ===
The Spanish-American silver dollar brought over by the Manila galleons was the primary currency for international trade, used in Asia and the Americas from the 16th to 19th centuries; it was eventually called the ringgit. The various dollars introduced in the 19th century were itself derived from the Spanish dollar: the Straits dollar, Sarawak dollar and the British North Borneo dollar. From these dollars were derived their successor currencies the Malayan dollar and the Malaya and British Borneo dollar, and eventually the modern-day Malaysian ringgit, Singapore dollar and Brunei dollar.

=== After independence (1967–1997) ===
On 12 June 1967, the Malaysian dollar, issued by the new central bank, Central Bank of Malaysia, replaced the Malaya and British Borneo dollar at par. The new currency retained all denominations of its predecessor except the $10,000 denomination, and also brought over the colour schemes of the old dollar. Over the course of the following decades, minor changes were made to the notes and coins issued, from the introduction of the M$1 coin in 1967, to the demonetization of RM500 and RM1,000 notes in 1999.

As the Malaysian dollar replaced the Malaya and British Borneo dollar at par and Malaysia was a participating member of the sterling area, the new dollar was originally valued at 8 4/7 dollars per 1 British pound sterling; in turn, £1 = US$2.80 so that US$1 = M$3.06. In November 1967, five months after the introduction of the Malaysian dollar, the pound was devalued by 14.3% from US$2.80 to US$2.40, leading to a collapse in confidence for the sterling area and its demise in 1972. The new currency stayed pegged to the U.S. dollar at US$1 = M$3.06, but earlier notes of the Malaya and British Borneo dollar were devalued from US$2.80 to US$2.40 for 8.57 dollars; consequently these notes were reduced in value to 85 cents per dollar.

Despite the emergence of new currencies in Malaysia, Singapore and Brunei, the Interchangeability Agreement which the three countries adhered to as original members of the currency union meant the Malaysian dollar was exchangeable at par with the Singapore dollar and Brunei dollar. This ended on 8 May 1973, when the Malaysian government withdrew from the agreement. The Monetary Authority of Singapore and the Brunei Currency and Monetary Board still maintain the interchangeability of their two currencies, as of 2021.

The Malaysian ringgit name was introduced in 1975, and in 1993, the currency symbol "RM" (Ringgit Malaysia) was adopted to replace the use of the dollar sign "$" (or "M$").

=== Asian financial crisis and US dollar currency peg (1997–2005) ===
Between 1995 and 1997, the ringgit was trading as a free float currency at around 2.50 to the US dollar, but following the onset of the 1997 Asian financial crisis, the ringgit witnessed major dips to under 3.80 to the dollar by the end of 1997 as a result of capital flight. During the first half of 1998, the currency fluctuated between 3.80 and 4.40 ringgits, before the Central Bank of Malaysia moved to peg the ringgit to the dollar in September 1998, maintaining its 3.80 ringgit value while remaining floated against other currencies. In addition, the ringgit was designated non-tradeable outside of Malaysia in 1998 to stem the flow of money out of the country.

While the printing of RM500 and RM1,000 notes had ceased in 1996 in response to risks of money laundering and capital flight, the underestimated effects of the financial crisis prompted the central bank to completely discontinue the use of the notes by demonetising the remaining notes in circulation beginning 1 July 1999. The two denominations hereby ceased to be legal tender and were only exchangeable directly at the central bank; at the time of the demonetization, RM500 and RM1,000 notes were each worth approximately $130 and $260 respectably, based on the 3.80 ringgit-to-dollar peg rate. Despite these measures, some 7.6% of RM500 notes and 0.6% of RM1,000 notes remain in circulation as of 30 January 2011. During a 2011 parliamentary session, then Deputy Finance Minister Donald Lim Siang Chai asserted that a total of 150,599 and 26,018 RM500 and RM1,000 notes (RM75,299,500 worth of RM500 notes and RM26,018,000.00 worth of RM1,000 notes) had yet to be "recalled" through the central bank.

The ringgit lost 50% of its value against the US dollar between 1997 and 1998, and suffered general depreciation against other currencies between December 2001 and January 2005. As of 4 September 2008, the ringgit had yet to regain its value circa 2001 against the Singapore dollar (2.07 to 2.40 ringgits to the Singapore dollar), the euro (3.40 to 4.97 ringgits to the euro), the Australian dollar (1.98 to 2.80 ringgits to the Australian dollar), and the British pound (5.42 to 6.10 ringgits to the pound).

On 21 July 2005, Central Bank of Malaysia announced the end of the peg to the US dollar immediately after China's announcement of the end of the renminbi peg to the dollar. According to Bank Negara, Malaysia allows the ringgit to operate in a managed float against several major currencies. This has resulted in the value of the ringgit rising closer to its perceived market value, although Central Bank of Malaysia has intervened in financial markets to maintain stability in the trading level of the ringgit, a task made easier by the fact that the ringgit was pegged and has remained non-tradeable outside Malaysia since 1998.

=== Post-US dollar currency peg performance (2005–present) ===
Following the end of the currency peg, the ringgit appreciated to as high as 3.16 ringgits to the US dollar in April 2008. The ringgit had also enjoyed a period of appreciation against the Hong Kong dollar (from RM0.49 to RM0.44 to the HK dollar) and the renminbi (RM0.46 to RM0.45 per renminbi) as recently as May 2008. The initial stability of the ringgit in the late-2000s had led to considerations to reintroduce the currency to foreign trading after over a decade of being non-internationalised. In a CNBC interview in September 2010, Najib Tun Razak, the then Prime Minister and Finance Minister of Malaysia, was quoted in stating that the government was planning the reentry of the ringgit into off-shore trading if the move will help the economy, with the condition that rules and regulations were put in place to prevent abuses. Despite considerations, the ringgit has continued to remain non-internationalised in a deliberate move to continue discouraging off-shore trading of the currency.

Political uncertainty following the country's 2008 general election and the 2008 Permatang Pauh by-election, falling crude oil prices in the late-2000s, and the lack of intervention by the Central Bank of Malaysia to increase already low interest rates (which remained at 3.5% between April 2006 and November 2008) led to a slight fall of the ringgit's value against the US dollar between May and July 2008, followed by a sharper drop between August and September of the same year. As a result, the dollar appreciated significantly to close at RM3.43 to the dollar as of 4 September 2008, while other major currencies, including the renminbi and Hong Kong dollar, followed suit. The ringgit spiked at RM3.73 to the US dollar by March 2009, before gradually recovering to RM3.00 by mid-2011 and normalising at around RM3.10 to the dollar between 2011 and 2014.

The ringgit experienced more acute plunges in the value since mid-2014 following the escalation of the 1Malaysia Development Berhad scandal that raised allegations of political channeling of billions of ringgit to off-shore accounts, and uncertainty from the 2015–16 Chinese stock market turbulence and the effects of the 2016 United States presidential election results. The currency's value fell from an average of RM3.20 to the dollar in mid-2014 to around RM3.70 by early 2015; with China being Malaysia's largest trading partner, a Chinese stock market crash in June 2015 triggered another plunge in value for the ringgit, which reached levels unseen since 1998 at lows of RM4.43 in September 2015, before stabilising around RM4.10 to RM4.20 to the dollar soon after; the currency later plummeted and hover below the 1998 lows at RM4.40 and RM4.50, following the wake of the victory of pro-protectionist Donald Trump in the 2016 United States presidential election, which has raised questions of the United States' participation in the Trans-Pacific Partnership (TPP) (which Malaysia is a signatory of, and the United States had promptly pulled out from in January 2017) and Malaysia–United States trade as a whole (as the United States is among Malaysia's largest trading partners).

In response to the sharp drop of the ringgit in November 2016, Central Bank of Malaysia began a series of tougher crackdowns on under-the-counter non-deliverable forward trading of the ringgit in order to curb currency speculation. Since then, the currency has seen a steady but consistent rate of appreciation against the US dollar, with significant increases since early-November 2017 following reports of positive economic performance, the restructuring of the TPP into the Comprehensive and Progressive Agreement for Trans-Pacific Partnership and increasing global oil prices. After appreciating as high as RM3.86 to the dollar as of early April 2018, the value dropped to around RM.18 by the end of October 2018 following increasing trade war tensions in response to the China–United States trade war, selloff panic from other emerging markets, as well as uncertainty in economic policy following an upset by the Pakatan Harapan coalition in the 2018 general election. With the exception of the euro, the currency's also saw some recovery of value to pre-late 2016 levels against other major currencies, including the renminbi, British pound, Australian dollar, Japanese yen and Singaporean dollar, but remained less valuable overall than before the end of 2013.

The ringgit was ranked among the region's worst-performing currencies through much of 2023 and early 2024, mostly due to widening interest rate differentials between the US and Malaysia. But in 2024, the currency saw an overall appreciation of 2.7% against the dollar. It was also one of the few currencies in Asia to appreciate against the dollar driven by external factors that previously weighed it down, alongside strengthening domestic fundamentals and a resilient domestic expenditure and further improvement in external demand to support growth in 2025. This is a 39-month high against the dollar due to resilient coordinated effort between the government and Bank Negara Malaysia and the country's promising economic prospects.

== Historical exchange rates ==
Single currency units in ringgit, averaged over the year
Currency	1970	1980	1990	1995	2000	2005	2010	2015	2020	2025	2026
United States dollar	3.06	2.18	2.70	2.54	3.80	3.78	3.06	3.90	4.20	4.28	3.91
Euro	Introduced in 1999				3.51	4.71	4.27	4.33	4.79	4.85	4.60
British pound	3.80	3.10	4.82	3.95	5.76	6.89	4.97	5.94	5.39	5.64	5.32
Singapore dollar	1.00	1.02	1.42	1.79	2.20	2.28	2.36	2.84	3.05	3.27	3.09
Australian dollar	3.20	2.40	2.11	1.89	2.21	2.89	2.96	2.93	2.90	2.76	2.84
Japanese yen	No data		0.01	0.02	0.03	0.03	0.04	0.03	0.04	0.03	0.02
Chinese yuan	1.50	1.20	0.75	0.30	0.45	0.46	0.48	0.62	0.60	0.60	0.57

Current MYR exchange rates
From Google Finance:	AUD CAD CHF CNY EUR GBP HKD JPY USD INR SGD IDR
From Yahoo! Finance:	AUD CAD CHF CNY EUR GBP HKD JPY USD INR SGD IDR
From XE.com:	AUD CAD CHF CNY EUR GBP HKD JPY USD INR SGD IDR
From OANDA:	AUD CAD CHF CNY EUR GBP HKD JPY USD INR SGD IDR

== Coinage ==
=== First series (1967) ===
The first series of sen coins were introduced in 1967 in denominations of 1, 5, 10, 20 and 50 sen, followed by the introduction of the 1 ringgit coin (which used the $ symbol and is the largest coin in the series) in 1971. While varied by diameters, virtually all the coins were minted in near-consistent obverse and reverse designs and were very generic, with the obverse depicting the then recently completed Malaysian Houses of Parliament and the federal star and crescent moon from the canton of the Malaysian flag. All coins were minted from cupronickel, the only exception being the 1 sen coin, which was first composed from bronze between 1967 and 1972, then in steel clad with copper from 1973 onwards. The 50 sen coin is the only one in the series to undergo a redesign, a minor 1971 modification on its edge to include "Bank Negara Malaysia" letterings. All coins have the initials GC on the reverse, below the Parliament House. It stands for Geoffrey Colley, Malaysia first coin series' designer. The 1 ringgit coin was never popular at the time due to being in conflict with a banknote of equal face value, similar to the current situation regarding the 1 dollar coin of the United States dollar.

The coins of this first series were identical in size and composition to those of the former Malaya and British Borneo dollar. Though the Malayan currency union coins were withdrawn, they still appear in circulation on very rare occasions.

Minting of the first sen series ended in 1989, when the second series was introduced. The older coins remain legal tender as of 2019, but have steadily declined in number and are seldom seen in circulation in Malaysia.

First series (1967)
Value	Technical parameters		Description			Minted from	First issue
Value	Diameter (mm)	Composition	Edge	Obverse	Reverse	Minted from	First issue
1 sen	18.00	Bronze	Smooth	Parliament House; 14-pointed star and crescent moon	Lettering: Malaysia; value and year of minting	1967–1981	12 June 1967
1 sen	18.00	Copper-clad steel	Smooth	Parliament House; 14-pointed star and crescent moon	Lettering: Malaysia; value and year of minting	1973–1988	1973
5 sen	16.00	Cupronickel	Milled	Parliament House; 14-pointed star and crescent moon	Lettering: Malaysia; value and year of minting	1967–1988	12 June 1967
10 sen	19.00	Cupronickel	Milled	Parliament House; 14-pointed star and crescent moon	Lettering: Malaysia; value and year of minting	1967–1988	12 June 1967
20 sen	23.00	Cupronickel	Milled	Parliament House; 14-pointed star and crescent moon	Lettering: Malaysia; value and year of minting	1967–1988	12 June 1967
50 sen	28.00	Cupronickel	Security	Parliament House; 14-pointed star and crescent moon	Lettering: Malaysia; value and year of minting	1967–1970	12 June 1967
50 sen	28.00	Cupronickel	Lettering: BANK NEGARA MALAYSIA	Parliament House; 14-pointed star and crescent moon	Lettering: Malaysia; value and year of minting	1971–1988	1 May 1971
$1	33.00	Cupronickel	Lettering: BANK NEGARA MALAYSIA	Parliament House; 14-pointed star and crescent moon	Lettering: Malaysia; value and year of minting	1971–1986	1 May 1971

=== Second series (1989) ===
The second series of sen coins entered circulation in late 1989, sporting completely redesigned obverses and reverses, but predominantly retaining the design of edges, diameters and composition of the previous series' coins previous to 1989, the 1 ringgit coin being the exception. Changes include the depiction of items of Malay culture on the obverse, such as a local mancala game board called congkak on the 10 sen and the wau bulan or "moon kite" on the 50 sen among other things, as well as the inclusion of a Hibiscus rosa-sinensis (Malay: Bunga Raya), the national flower of Malaysia, on the upper half of the reverse. The second series was designed by Low Yee Kheng.

In addition to changes on its obverse and reverse, the size of the 1 ringgit coin was also reduced from a diameter of 33 to 24, and was minted from an alloy of copper, zinc and tin, as opposed to the first series' cupronickel. The $ symbol was brought over to the new coin, but was dropped in favour of "RINGGIT" for coins minted from 1993 onwards. On 7 December 2005, the 1 ringgit coin was demonetised and withdrawn from circulation. This was partly due to problems with standardisation (two different versions of the second series coin were minted) and forgery.

As of 1 April 2008, a rounding mechanism of prices to the nearest 5 sen, applied to the total bill only, is in force, which was first announced in 2007 by Central Bank of Malaysia, in an attempt to render the 1 sen coin irrelevant. Individual items and services can still be priced in multiples of 1 sen with the final totalled rounded to the nearest 5 sen. For example, purchasing two items priced RM4.88 and RM3.14, totalling RM8.02, would then be rounded to RM8.00. If each item had been individually rounded (to RM4.90 and RM3.15 respectively) the incorrect total would have been RM8.05. In practice, individual items will probably remain priced at so-called "price points" (or psychological pricing and odd-number pricing) ending in 98 and 99 to maximise rounding gains for the vendor, especially in the case of single item purchases. Existing 1 sen coins in circulation remain legal tender for payments up to RM2.00.

Second series (1989)
Value	Technical parameters			Description			Minted from	First issue	Withdrawn
Value	Diameter (mm)	Mass (g)	Composition	Edge	Obverse	Reverse	Minted from	First issue	Withdrawn
1 sen	17.78	1.74	Copper-clad steel	Smooth	Rebana ubi	National flower; Lettering: Bank Negara Malaysia; value, year of minting	1989–2008	4 September 1989	Current
5 sen	16.25	1.41	Cupronickel	Milled	Gasing	National flower; Lettering: Bank Negara Malaysia; value, year of minting	1989–2011	4 September 1989	Current
10 sen	19.40	2.82	Cupronickel	Milled	Congkak	National flower; Lettering: Bank Negara Malaysia; value, year of minting	1989–2011	4 September 1989	Current
20 sen	23.59	5.66	Cupronickel	Milled	Tepak sireh	National flower; Lettering: Bank Negara Malaysia; value, year of minting	1989–2011	4 September 1989	Current
50 sen	27.76	9.33	Cupronickel	Lettering: BANK NEGARA MALAYSIA	Wau	National flower; Lettering: Bank Negara Malaysia; value, year of minting	1989–2011	4 September 1989	Current
$1	24.50	9.30	Copper: 84% Zinc: 12% Tin: 4%	Milled	Keris and songket	Similar except for value: $1	1989–1993	4 September 1989	2005
$1	24.50	9.30	Copper: 84% Zinc: 12% Tin: 4%	Milled	Keris and songket	Similar except for value: 1 RINGGIT	1993–1998	1993	2005
For table standards, see the coin specification table.

=== Third series (2012) ===
The third series of coins were announced on 25 July 2011, first being issued as commemorative coins to mark their release on 16 January 2012. The third series carry a theme named "Distinctively Malaysia" and are inspired from motifs of flora and fauna drawn from various cultures in Malaysia to "reflect the diversity and richness of Malaysia's national identity". The denominations issued are 5, 10, 20 and 50 sen. On 24 October 2011, Deputy Finance Minister Datuk Donald Lim announced a South Korean firm as the series' coin supplier. The coins are minted at the Bank Negara Mint in Shah Alam.

According to Lim, costs in producing the coins will be reduced by 49% due to the change in metal composition. Other changes in the series include the diameter, the colour on the 20- and 50 sen coins (from silver to yellow) and a redesign on the obverse (featuring different motifs for each denomination), fourteen dots symbolising the thirteen states and the collective Federal Territories, and five horizontal lines indicating the five principles of Rukunegara.

The 50-cent coin is more distinctive than the other denominations. The round shape of the coin has nine indentations, forgoing the original "BANK NEGARA MALAYSIA" lettering. The obverse does not feature the five horizontal lines, but instead a latent image security feature is placed over the coin, where lettering of the denomination "50" and "SEN" can be seen when the coin is tilted slightly.

The 20 sen and 50 sen coins look similar to €0.10 and €0.20 coin in size, edge design and colour; however, they are only worth at €0.047 and €0.12 respectively.

Third series (2012)
Value	Technical parameters			Description			Minted from	First issue
Value	Diameter (mm)	Mass (g)	Composition	Edge	Obverse	Reverse	Minted from	First issue
5 sen	17.78	1.72	Stainless steel	Smooth	Destar siga pattern; Sulur kacang; 14 dots and 5 lines (Rukun Negara)	National flower; Lettering: Bank Negara Malaysia; value, year of minting	2011	16 January 2012
10 sen	18.80	2.98	Stainless steel	Milled	Mah Meri people weave pattern; 14 dots and 5 lines (Rukun Negara)	National flower; Lettering: Bank Negara Malaysia; value, year of minting	2011	16 January 2012
20 sen	20.60	4.18	Nickel-brass	Milled	Jasmine flower; Destar siga pattern; 14 dots and 5 lines (Rukun Negara)	National flower; Lettering: Bank Negara Malaysia; value, year of minting	2011	16 January 2012
50 sen	22.65	5.66	Nickel-brass clad copper	Spanish flower (9 indents)	Sulur kacang; 14 dots; Latent image: 50 and SEN	National flower; Lettering: Bank Negara Malaysia; value, year of minting	2011	16 January 2012
For table standards, see the coin specification table.

=== Kijang Emas ===
Three denominations of gold bullion coins, the "Kijang Emas" (the kijang, a species of deer, being part of Central Bank of Malaysia's logo) are also issued, at the face value of RM 50, RM 100 and RM 200, weighing 1/4 oz, 1/2 oz and 1 oz (Troy ounce), respectively. It is minted by the Kilang Wang Central Bank of Malaysia and was launched on 17 July 2001 by Central Bank of Malaysia, making Malaysia the twelfth country to issue its own gold bullion coins. Like other bullion coins issued around the world, the Kijang Emas is primarily used as an investment rather than in day-to-day circulation. The purchase and resale price of Kijang Emas is determined by the prevailing international gold market price. Current price of the Kijang Emas is rated at RM 17575 for 1oz, RM 8953 for 1/2 oz and RM 4560 for 1/4 oz (7 November 2026).

== Banknotes ==
=== First series (1967) ===
The Central Bank of Malaysia first issued Malaysian dollar banknotes on 6 June 1967 in $1, $5, $10, $50 and $100 denominations. The $1000 denomination was first issued on 2 September 1968. The first Malaysian banknotes carried the image of Tuanku Abdul Rahman, the first Yang di-Pertuan Agong of independent Malaya and bore the signature of Ismail Mohamed Ali, the first native Malaysian governor of the BNM. On 16 August 1972, banknotes with revised spelling were introduced.

First series
Value	Dimensions (mm)	Main colour	Description		Issued from	Issue suspended	Withdrawn
Value	Dimensions (mm)	Main colour	Obverse	Reverse	Issued from	Issue suspended	Withdrawn
$1	121 × 62	Blue	Tuanku Abdul Rahman	Bank Negara Malaysia logo (Kijang Emas)	6 June 1967	1984	Phased out
$5	127 × 71	Green	Tuanku Abdul Rahman	Bank Negara Malaysia logo (Kijang Emas)	6 June 1967	1984	Phased out
$10	133 × 80	Red	Tuanku Abdul Rahman	Bank Negara Malaysia logo (Kijang Emas)	6 June 1967	1983	Phased out
$50	145 × 88	Navy blue	Tuanku Abdul Rahman	Bank Negara Malaysia logo (Kijang Emas)	6 June 1967	1983	Phased out
$100	158 × 95	Indigo	Tuanku Abdul Rahman	Bank Negara Malaysia logo (Kijang Emas)	6 June 1967	1983	Phased out
$1000	160 × 88	Purple	Tuanku Abdul Rahman	Houses of Parliament	2 September 1968	1984	1 July 1999
For table standards, see the banknote specification table.

=== Second series (1982-1984) ===
The second series was issued with the main theme being that of Malaysian traditional ornamental designs. Two new denominations, that of $20 and $500, was introduced in 1982; it was followed by redesigned banknotes for the $10, $50 and $100 denominations in 1983 before completing with redesigned $1, $5 & $1000 notes in 1984. All banknotes of this series were printed by Thomas De La Rue. Until 2010, the second series notes was still occasionally encountered.

In 1986, the mark for the blind on the upper left hand corner was removed, and a security strip was added to all denominations except for the 1 ringgit.

Printing of $1 notes were discontinued in 1993 with the $1 coin replacing it.

Due to its unpopularity, the $20 (RM20) denominations were discontinued and gradually removed from circulation in 1995.

In 1999 the RM500 and RM1000 notes were discontinued and ceased to be legal tender. This was due because of the Asian monetary crisis of 1997 when huge amounts of ringgit were taken out of the country to be traded in these notes. In effect the notes were withdrawn out of circulation and the amount of ringgit taken out of the country in banknotes was limited to RM1000.

Second series
Value	Dimensions (mm)	Main colour	Description		Issued from	Issue suspended	Withdrawn
Value	Dimensions (mm)	Main colour	Obverse	Reverse	Issued from	Issue suspended	Withdrawn
$1	120 × 64	Blue	Tuanku Abdul Rahman	National Monument	1984	1993	Phased out
$5	126 × 68	Green	Tuanku Abdul Rahman	Istana Negara, Jalan Istana	1984	1999	Phased out
$10	132 × 71	Red	Tuanku Abdul Rahman	Kuala Lumpur Railway Station	1983	1998	Phased out
$20	133 × 74	Brown	Tuanku Abdul Rahman	Bank Negara Malaysia	1982	1995	Phased out
$50	133 × 74	Turquoise	Tuanku Abdul Rahman	National Museum	1983	1998	Phased out
$100	150 × 83	Indigo	Tuanku Abdul Rahman	Masjid Negara	1983	1998	Phased out
$500	155 × 83	Orange	Tuanku Abdul Rahman	Sultan Abdul Samad Building	1982	1996	1 July 1999
$1000	160 × 83	Blue green	Tuanku Abdul Rahman	Houses of Parliament	1984	1996	1 July 1999
For table standards, see the banknote specification table.

=== Third series (1996) ===
The third series was issued with designs in the spirit of Wawasan 2020 in 1996 in denominations of RM1, RM2, RM5, RM10, RM50 and RM100. The larger denomination RM50 and RM100 notes had an additional hologram strip to deter counterfeiters.

In 2004, Central Bank of Malaysia issued a new RM10 note with additional security features including the holographic strip previously only seen on the RM50 and RM100 notes. A new RM5 polymer banknote with a distinctive transparent window was also issued. Both new banknotes are almost identical to their original third series designs. At one time, Central Bank of Malaysia announced its intention to eventually phase out all paper notes and replace them with polymer notes.

Third series (Vision 2020)
Value	Dimensions (mm)	Substrate	Main colour	Description		Issued from	Issue suspended
Value	Dimensions (mm)	Substrate	Main colour	Obverse	Reverse	Issued from	Issue suspended
RM1	120 × 65	Paper	Blue	Tuanku Abdul Rahman	Mount Kinabalu and Mulu; Wau bulan	8 November 2000	16 July 2012
RM2	130 × 65	Paper	Lilac	Tuanku Abdul Rahman	Kuala Lumpur Tower; satellite	5 February 1996	1 January 2000
RM5	135 × 65	Paper	Green	Tuanku Abdul Rahman	KLIA; Petronas Twin Towers	27 September 1999	26 October 2004
RM5	135 × 65	Polymer	Green	Tuanku Abdul Rahman	KLIA; Petronas Twin Towers	26 October 2004	16 July 2012
RM10	140 × 65	Paper	Red	Tuanku Abdul Rahman	Putra LRT train; MISC ship; Malaysia Airlines Boeing 777 aircraft	10 January 1998	5 January 2004
RM10	140 × 65	Paper	Red	Tuanku Abdul Rahman	Putra LRT train; MISC ship; Malaysia Airlines Boeing 777 aircraft	5 January 2004 (with hologram)	16 July 2012
RM50	145 × 69	Paper	Turquoise	Tuanku Abdul Rahman	Oil platform	20 July 1998	30 January 2008
RM100	150 × 69	Paper	Indigo	Tuanku Abdul Rahman	Proton car production line and engine	26 October 1998	16 July 2012
For table standards, see the banknote specification table.

=== Fourth series (2012) ===
In early 2008, the bank released a newly designed RM50 banknote, which according to the bank, were to enter general circulation beginning 30 January 2008. Earlier, 20,000 more such notes with special packaging were distributed by the bank on 26 December 2007.

The newly designed RM50 banknote retains the predominant colour of green-blue, but is designed in a new theme, dubbed the "National Mission", expressing the notion of Malaysia "[moving] the economy up the value chain", in accordance to Malaysia's economic transformation to higher value-added activities in agriculture, manufacturing and services sectors of the economy. The dominant intaglio portrait of the first Yang di-Pertuan Agong, Tuanku Abdul Rahman, is retained on the right and the national flower, the hibiscus, is presented in the center on the obverse of the note. Design patterns from songket weaving, which are in the background and edges of the banknote, are featured to reflect the traditional Malay textile handicraft and embroidery.

The first 50 million pieces of the new RM50 banknote features Malaysia's first Prime Minister, Tunku Abdul Rahman, at the historic declaration of Malaya's independence, and the logo of the 50th Anniversary of Independence on the reverse. Security features on the banknote include a watermarked portrait of the Yang di-Pertuan Agong, a security thread, micro letterings, fluorescent elements visible only under ultraviolet light, a multi coloured latent image which changes colour when viewed at different angles, and a holographic stripe at the side of the note and an image that is visible only via a moiré effect to prevent counterfeiting using photocopiers. Circulation for the first edition of this new RM50 banknote was eventually curtailed by the Central Bank due to the various Malaysia banks' automatic teller machines inability to accept it. The bank began to re-release the new series for general circulation beginning 15 July 2009 without the 50th Anniversary logo. This edition include new enhanced security features such as two color number fluorescents and security fibres.

In May 2011, Central Bank of Malaysia had announced that they will introduce a new series of banknotes to replace the current design that has been in circulation for around 15 years. The most highlighted part of the announcement is the re-introduction of the RM20 note, which was not included in the third series. The design of the new notes was announced on 21 December 2011, and the notes are expected to be put into circulation in the second half of 2012. The new series banknotes are legal tender and will co-circulate with the existing series. The existing series will be gradually phased out. All 4 series of banknotes (except 500, and 1000) are technically still legal tender, but some vendors may not accept the first and second series banknotes (rarely seen now). All banknote denominations in the new series will retain the portrait of the first Yang di-Pertuan Agong, Tuanku Abdul Rahman. The banknotes are supplied by Crane AB of Sweden, Giesecke & Devrient GmbH of Germany, Oberthur Technologies of France and Orell Fussli of Switzerland. They were put into circulation on 16 July 2012.

Fourth series (Distinctively Malaysia)
Value	Dimensions (mm)	Substrate	Main colour	Description		Issue
Value	Dimensions (mm)	Substrate	Main colour	Obverse	Reverse	Issue
RM1	120 × 65	Polymer	Blue	Tuanku Abdul Rahman; Hibiscus and songket patterns	Wau bulan	16 July 2012
RM5	135 × 65	Polymer	Green	Tuanku Abdul Rahman; Hibiscus and songket patterns	Rhinoceros hornbill	16 July 2012
RM10	140 × 65	Paper	Red	Tuanku Abdul Rahman; Hibiscus and songket patterns	Rafflesia	16 July 2012
RM20	145 × 65	Paper	Orange	Tuanku Abdul Rahman; Hibiscus and songket patterns	Hawksbill and leatherback turtles	16 July 2012
RM50	145 × 69	Paper	Cyan	Tuanku Abdul Rahman; Hibiscus and songket patterns	Tunku Abdul Rahman; Oil palm trees	30 January 2008 (Note: With 50th anniversary logo.)
RM50	145 × 69	Paper	Cyan	Tuanku Abdul Rahman; Hibiscus and songket patterns	Tunku Abdul Rahman; Oil palm trees	15 July 2009
RM100	150 × 69	Paper	Purple	Tuanku Abdul Rahman; Hibiscus and songket patterns	Mount Kinabalu and Mount Api	16 July 2012
These images are to scale at 0.7 pixel per millimetre (18 pixel per inch). For table standards, see the banknote specification table.

=== Commemorative banknotes ===
==== 1998 Commonwealth Games ====
To commemorate the 1998 Commonwealth Games in Kuala Lumpur, a commemorative RM50 polymer banknote was issued on 1 June 1998. This was the first polymer banknote to be issued by Central Bank of Malaysia and was printed by Note Printing Australia (NPA). A total of 500,000 sets were issued. They were sold in special packaging and at a premium price of 80 ringgit. This note is hardly ever seen in normal usage, its use being a collector's commemorative.

==== 50th Anniversary of Independence ====
On 21 December 2007, Central Bank of Malaysia issued a commemorative 50 ringgit banknote to commemorate Malaysia's 50th Anniversary of Independence. The design was that of the 50 ringgit banknote of the fourth series, except with the additional logo of the 50th Anniversary of Independence at the top right of the reverse side, and the inscription "1957-2007" also on the reverse side of the banknote. The regular 50 ringgit notes which were issued later from 2009 onward did not carry these additional design features

A total of 50 million banknotes which bore the commemorative design, with serial number letter prefixes from AA to AE, were issued. Subsequent regular banknotes had serial number prefixes from AF onward. Of the 50 million commemorative banknotes, the first 20,000 were sold with a special packaging at a premium price of 60 ringgit.

==== 60th Anniversary of the Signing of the Federation of Malaya Independence Agreement ====
On 14 December 2017, Central Bank of Malaysia announced the issue of two paper-polymer hybrid commemorative banknotes in conjunction with the sixtieth anniversary of the Signing of the Federation of Malaya Independence Agreement. The banknotes were in the denominations of 60 ringgit and 600 ringgit. The 60 ringgit note was also made available in a 3-in-1 format.

The 600 ringgit note is the largest legal tender banknote in terms of size to be issued in the world, measuring 370mm by 220mm.

The notes were released for sale online on 29 December 2017 at a premium, with the 60 ringgit note sold at 120 ringgit, the 3-in-1 60 ringgit note at 500 ringgit and the 600 ringgit note at 1,700 ringgit. The print run for the 60 ringgit note was 60,000 while that for both the 3-in-1 60 ringgit and 600 ringgit note were at 6,000.

==== Summary of commemorative banknotes ====
Commemorative
Image		Value	Dimensions	Main colour	Description		Date of issue	Remark
Obverse	Reverse	Value	Dimensions	Main colour	Obverse	Reverse	Date of issue	Remark
Image restricted due to copyright; View photograph		RM50	152 × 76 mm	Yellow and green	Tuanku Abdul Rahman, the skyline of Kuala Lumpur (with the Petronas Twin Towers)	Bukit Jalil Sports complex	1 June 1998	Polymer (Biaxially-oriented polypropylene)
Image restricted due to copyright; View photograph		RM50	145 × 69 mm	Blue and green	Tuanku Abdul Rahman with the national flower, hibiscus	Malaysia's first Prime Minister, Tunku Abdul Rahman Putra Al-Haj and the logo of the 50th Anniversary of Independence. Oil palm trees	26 December 2007	First 20,000 identified with yellow border at both sides (Prefix from AA 0000001 to AA 0020000).
		RM60	162 × 84 mm	Yellow and green	Royal throne encircled by the portraits of 15 Yang di-Pertuan Agong	Portraits of the nine rulers signing the Federation of Malaya Independence Agreement, silhouette of Tunku Abdul Rahman Putra Al-Haj, National Palace, Perdana Putra, Parliament building and Palace of Justice	14 December 2017	Polymer and paper substrate
		RM600	370 × 220 mm	Yellow and green	Royal throne encircled by the portraits of 15 Yang di-Pertuan Agong	Portraits of the nine rulers signing the Federation of Malaya Independence Agreement, silhouette of Tunku Abdul Rahman Putra Al-Haj, National Palace, Perdana Putra, Parliament building and Palace of Justice	14 December 2017	Polymer and paper substrate
These images are to scale at 0.7 pixel per millimetre (18 pixel per inch). For table standards, see the banknote specification table.

Current MYR exchange rates
From Google Finance:	AUD CAD CHF CNY EUR GBP HKD JPY USD ZAR EUR JPY
From Yahoo! Finance:	AUD CAD CHF CNY EUR GBP HKD JPY USD ZAR EUR JPY
From XE.com:	AUD CAD CHF CNY EUR GBP HKD JPY USD ZAR EUR JPY
From OANDA:	AUD CAD CHF CNY EUR GBP HKD JPY USD ZAR EUR JPY

== See also ==
- Economy of Malaysia
- List of states and federal territories of Malaysia by household income

Preceded by: Malaya and British Borneo dollar Reason: Currency Agreement; Ratio: at par, or 60 dollars = 7 British pounds	Currency of Malaysia; 1967 –	Succeeded by: Current
