= William Champion =

William Champion may refer to:

- William Champion (metallurgist) (1709–1789), early producer of zinc in the United Kingdom
- William Julius Champion Jr. (1880–1972), popularizer of Kalah
- Will Champion (born 1978), drummer for Coldplay

== See also ==
- Bill Champion (disambiguation)
