= Shape risk =

Forecasted load shape profile (in dark blue) and forward contracts for base load, peak load and several hourly contracts (in orange) bought under the assumption that buying energy on the spot market is cheaper than selling. The remaining (beige) shape exposure cannot be captured by contracts.

Shape risk in finance is a type of basis risk when hedging a load profile with standard hedging products having a lower granularity. In other words, a commodity supplier wants to pre-purchase supplies for expected demand, but can only buy in fixed amounts that are bigger or smaller than the demand forecasted. This means it has to either over order or under order and make up the difference at the time of delivery at the spot price which might be much higher. Shape risk is also related to commodity risk.

For example an electricity provider has to produce or buy electricity in advance in order to distribute to its consumers based on forecasts i.e. how much energy will be consumed every minute on the following day. Such forecasts are usually based on the average historical consumption of the same set of customers; however, the provider can only produce e.g. only hourly blocks of electricity of 1MWh, and not smaller quantities. There is a certain financial risk that the provider produces too little energy and thus has to buy the remaining power from a market opponent for a high spot price to be able to fulfill the need of its customers.

== Use in electricity hedging ==
Shape risk is especially relevant in electricity markets because consumption varies by hour, while many exchange-traded hedging products are standardised around fixed delivery blocks. Baseload contracts cover delivery throughout all hours of the contract period, while peakload contracts cover delivery during specified peak hours, such as daytime weekday periods. These contracts can reduce exposure to average price movements but may not fully match the hourly shape of a supplier's forecast demand.

The residual exposure arises when the hedged volume differs from actual load in individual delivery periods. A supplier that has bought standard forward or futures contracts may still need to buy additional electricity in the spot market when actual demand exceeds the hedged profile, or sell excess electricity when demand is lower than expected. This mismatch between the physical load shape and the available hedging products is the main source of shape risk.
