= Ali Guli Mane =

Abstract strategy board game in India

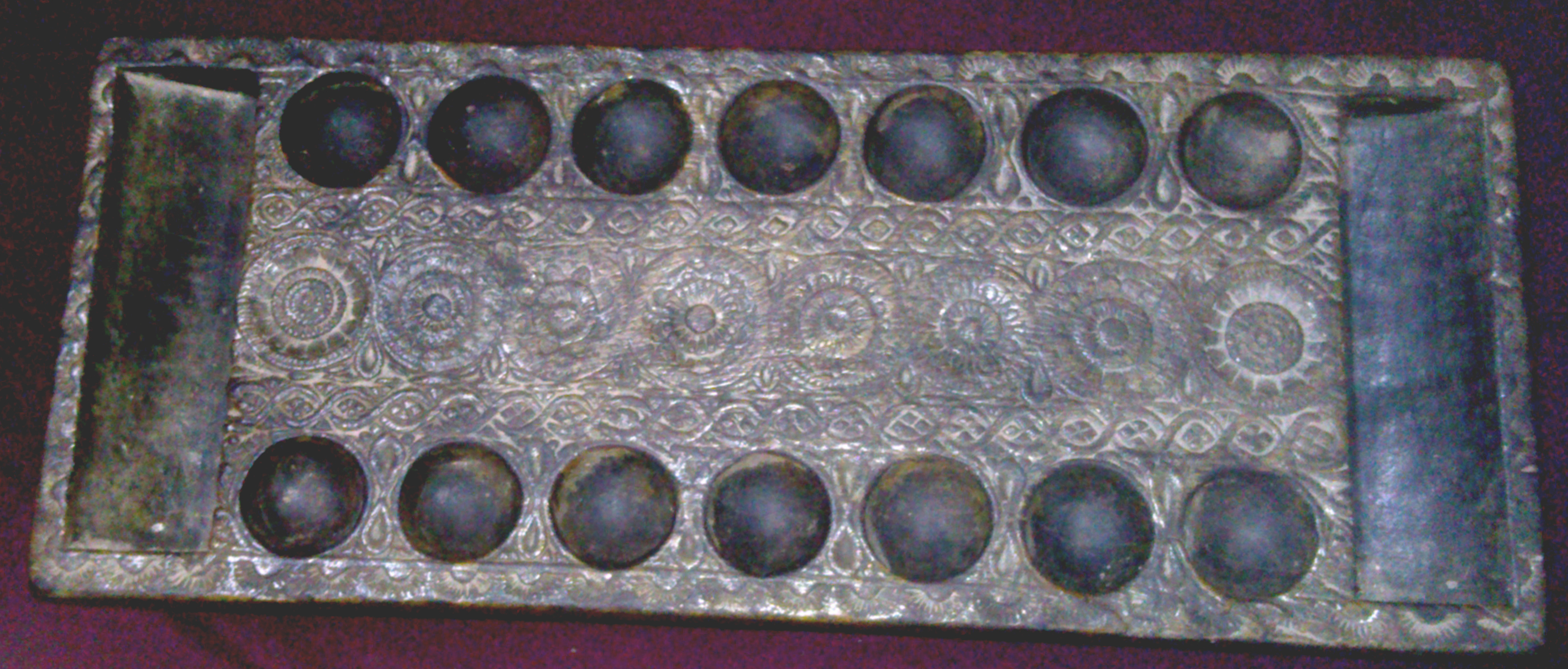
Chennemane

Ali Guli Mane (Kannada: ಅಳಿ ಗುಳಿ ಮಣೆ; Tulu: ಚೆನ್ನೆಮಣೆ) is an abstract strategy board game of the mancala family, from Karnataka in South India. It is known as Chenne Mane in Tulu Nadu, Akal Patta in North Karnataka, and Satkoli (सत्कोलि) in Maharashtra. The name of the game, like that of many mancala games across the world, is simply a description of the board used: it means a "wooden block with holes". It is similar to pallanguzhi from the neighbouring state of Tamil Nadu. There are also similarities with the traditional Malay mancala game congkak.

== Initial setup ==
Ali Guli Mane uses two rows of 7 holes each. Each player "owns" the row of holes closest to them. The game starts with 70 pieces (usually tamarind seeds or small shells), with 5, 7 or 12 in each hole.

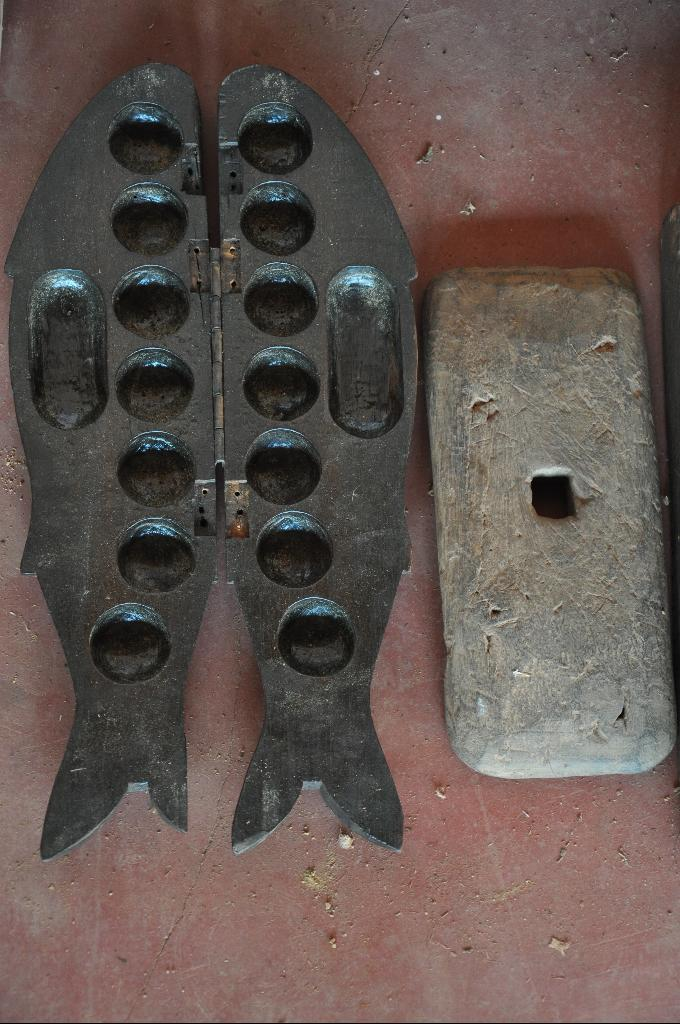
Chenna Mane

== Turns ==
In each turn, the player removes all seeds from a hole and distributes them clockwise or anti-clockwise, at their own choice. This sowing is done sequentially but the principle is slightly different from that used in a game like Pallanguzhi. Once the last of the seeds is placed, the player takes all the seeds in the next hole (clockwise or anti-clockwise as per the sowing) and continues placing them in this way.

If the next hole is empty (saada), the player stops and captures all the seeds in the hole next to the empty one, and all those in the hole opposite it. For instance, if an anti-clockwise sowing ends in A5 (and A4 is empty) then the player captures the contents of A3 and B3.

A1	A2	A3	A4	A5	A6	A7
B1	B2	B3	B4	B5	B6	B7

The player can take two sowings, if he captured in the first one; thus the turn ends after two saadas.

== Multiple matches ==
Ali Guli Mane is often played as the Congkak, following the first game with new matches handicapped. The players arrange in their own part the seeds that they have captured. The player who has won more seeds, having an excess (more than 35), can fill their holes with 5 seeds each, holding aside the additional seeds as "already captured". The other player fills as many holes with 5 seeds as possible, holding as "already captured" any remaining seeds not sufficient to fill a hole (i.e., up to 4). All holes left empty will be marked in some way to remember that they are "protected" holes, and they will not be used in the new game.

== See also ==
- Pallankuzhi
- Congkak
- Kalah
- List of mancala games
