= Non-deliverable forward =

Type of finance contract

In finance, a non-deliverable forward (NDF) is an outright forward contract or futures contract in which counterparties settle the difference between the contracted NDF price or rate and the prevailing spot price or rate on an agreed notional amount. It is used in various markets such as foreign exchange and commodities. NDFs are also known as forward contracts for differences (FCD).

NDFs are common in some countries where forward FX trading has been prohibited by the government, usually as a means to prevent exchange rate volatility.

== Market ==
The NDF market is an over-the-counter market. NDFs began to trade actively in the 1990s. NDF markets developed for emerging markets with capital controls, where the currencies could not be delivered offshore. Most NDFs are cash-settled in US dollars (USD).

The more active banks quote NDFs from between one month to one year, although some would quote up to two years upon request. The most commonly traded NDF tenors are IMM dates, but banks also offer odd-dated NDFs. NDFs are typically quoted with the USD as the reference currency, and the settlement amount is also in USD.

=== List of currencies with NDF market ===
Below is a (non-exhaustive) list of currencies where non-deliverable forwards are traded. Not all non-convertible currencies have a NDF market (e.g. BDT had no active market as of 2011). A currency may be convertible by some market participants while being non-convertible to others.

Asia Pacific	Europe, Middle East and Africa	Latin America
CNY Chinese renminbi; IDR Indonesian rupiah; INR Indian rupee; KRW South Korean won; MYR Malaysian ringgit; PHP Philippine peso; TWD Taiwan dollar; VND Vietnamese đồng	EGP Egyptian pound; KZT Kazakhstani tenge; NGN Nigerian Naira; UGX Ugandan shilling	ARS Argentine peso; BRL Brazilian real; CLP Chilean peso; COP Colombian peso; CRC Costa Rican colon; GTQ Guatemalan quetzal; PEN Peruvian nuevo sol; SRD Surinamese dollar; UYU Uruguayan peso; VEF Venezuelan bolívar

== Structure and features ==
An NDF is a short-term, cash-settled currency forward between two counterparties. On the contracted settlement date, the profit or loss is adjusted between the two counterparties based on the difference between the contracted NDF rate and the prevailing spot FX rates on an agreed notional amount.

The features of an NDF include:

- notional amount: This is the "face value" of the NDF, which is agreed between the two counterparties. It should again be noted that there is never any intention to exchange the notional amounts in the two currencies
- fixing date: This is the day and time whereby the comparison between the NDF rate and the prevailing spot rate is made. This is essentially 2 days before the settlement day.
- settlement date (or delivery date): This is the day when the difference is paid or received. It is usually one or two business days after the fixing date.
- contracted NDF rate: the rate agreed on the transaction date, and is essentially the outright forward rate of the currencies dealt.
- prevailing spot rate (or fixing spot rate): the rate on the fixing date usually provided by the central bank, and commonly calculated by calling a number of dealers in the market for a quote at a specified time of day, and taking the average. The exact method of determining the fixing rate is agreed when a trade is initiated.

Because an NDF is a cash-settled instrument, the notional amount is never exchanged. The only exchange of cash flows is the difference between the NDF rate and the prevailing spot market rate—that is determined on the fixing date and exchanged on the settlement date—applied to the notional, i.e. cash flow = (NDF rate – spot rate) × notional.

Consequently, since NDF is a "non-cash", off-balance-sheet item and since the principal sums do not move, NDF bears much lower counter-party risk. NDFs are committed short-term instruments; both counterparties are committed and are obliged to honor the deal. Nevertheless, either counterparty can cancel an existing contract by entering into another offsetting deal at the prevailing market rate.

== Pricing and valuation ==
An investor enters into a forward agreement to purchase a notional amount, N, of the base currency at the contracted forward rate, F, and would pay NF units of the quoted currency. On the fixing date, that investor would theoretically be able to sell the notional amount, N, of the base currency at the prevailing spot rate, S, earning NS units of the quoted currency. Therefore, the profit, $\pi$, on this trade in terms of the base currency, is given by:

$$\pi = \frac{NS - NF}{S} = N\left(1-\frac{F}{S}\right)$$

The base currency is usually the more liquid and more frequently traded currency (for example, US Dollar or Euros).

== Uses ==
=== Synthetic foreign currency loans ===
NDFs can be used to create a foreign currency loan in a currency, which may not be of interest to the lender.

For example, the borrower wants dollars but wants to make repayments in euros. So, the borrower receives a dollar sum and repayments will still be calculated in dollars, but payment will be made in euros, using the current exchange rate at time of repayment.

The lender wants to lend dollars and receive repayments in dollars. So, at the same time as disbursing the dollar sum to the borrower, the lender enters into a non-deliverable forward agreement with a counterparty (for example, on the Chicago market) that matches the cash flows from the foreign currency repayments.

Effectively, the borrower has a synthetic euro loan; the lender has a synthetic dollar loan; and the counterparty has an NDF contract with the lender.

=== Arbitrage opportunity ===
Under certain circumstances, the rates achievable using synthetic foreign currency lending may be lower than borrowing in the foreign currency directly, implying that there is a possibility for arbitrage. Although this is theoretically identical to a second currency loan (with settlement in dollars), the borrower may face basis risk: the possibility that a difference arises between the swap market's exchange rate and the exchange rate on the home market. The lender also bears counterparty risk.

The borrower could, in theory, enter into NDF contracts directly and borrow in dollars separately and achieve the same result. NDF counterparties, however, may prefer to work with a limited range of entities (such as those with a minimum credit rating).

=== Speculation ===
It is estimated that between 60 and 80 per cent of NDF trading is speculative. The main difference between the outright forward deals and the non-deliverable forwards is that the settlement is made in dollars since the dealer or counterparty can not settle in the alternative currency of the deal.

== Other sources ==
- Misra, Sangita; Behera, Harendra (2006), "Non Deliverable Foreign Exchange Forward Market: An Overview" (PDF), Reserve Bank of India Occasional Papers, 27 (3)
- Ma, Guonan; Ho, Corrinne; McCauley, Robert N. (2004), "The markets for non-deliverable forwards in Asian currencies" (PDF), BIS Quarterly Review (June 2004)
