= Bill Champion =

Bill Champion may refer to:

- Bill Champion (baseball) (1947–2017), American Major League Baseball player
- Bill Champion (racing driver) (1921–1991), American stock car racing driver
- Bill Champion (actor), British actor in Rockliffe's Babies

== See also ==
- William Champion (disambiguation)
