= Holding period risk =

Holding period exposure. Let us assume a firm offers a contract with a given wholesale price plus an additional risk premium at a given time.

Holding period risk is a financial risk that a firm's sales quote giving a potential retail client a certain time to sign the offer for a commodity, will actually be a financial disadvantage for the offering firm since the market price's on the wholesale market has changed. The risk is usually reduced by a risk premium being added onto the wholesale price of a commodity by the offering firm.

An alternative and less general definition is: Holding period risk is the risk, while holding a bond, that a better opportunity will present itself that you may be unable to act upon.

== Fixed-income interpretation ==
In fixed-income investing, holding period risk is related to the uncertainty of the return earned over the period for which a bond is actually held. A bond investor's holding-period return depends on coupon payments received, the reinvestment return on those coupons, and the price at which the bond can be sold or redeemed at the end of the holding period.

This risk is affected by the relationship between the investor's holding period and the bond's interest-rate sensitivity. When a bond is sold before maturity, changes in market interest rates can affect its sale price; when coupon payments are received before the end of the holding period, the return also depends on the rate at which those payments can be reinvested.
