= Margining risk =

Type of financial risk

Margining risk is a financial risk that future cash flows are smaller than expected due to the payment of margins, i.e. a collateral as deposit from a counterparty to cover some (or all) of its credit risk. It can be seen as a short-term liquidity risk, a quantity called MaR can be used to measure it.

== Methodology ==
In order to decrease the risk of a counter party to default, a technique called portfolio margining is applied, which simply means that the assets within a portfolio are clustered and sorted by the descending projected net loss, e.g. calculated by a pricing model. One can then determine for which cluster(s) one wants to perform margin calls.

== Liquidity implications ==
Margining risk is closely related to liquidity risk, since margin calls may require the rapid delivery of cash or other eligible collateral at short notice. International regulatory work on margin requirements for non-centrally cleared derivatives has emphasized the trade-off between reducing counterparty credit risk through margining and increasing the demand for liquid assets that can be posted as collateral.

This liquidity dimension may become especially important during periods of market stress, when margin requirements can rise and eligible collateral may become harder to mobilize. BIS analysis of central counterparties has similarly highlighted the connection between margining practices, collateral needs, and broader systemic liquidity risk.
