= Wau bulan =

Malaysian moon-kite

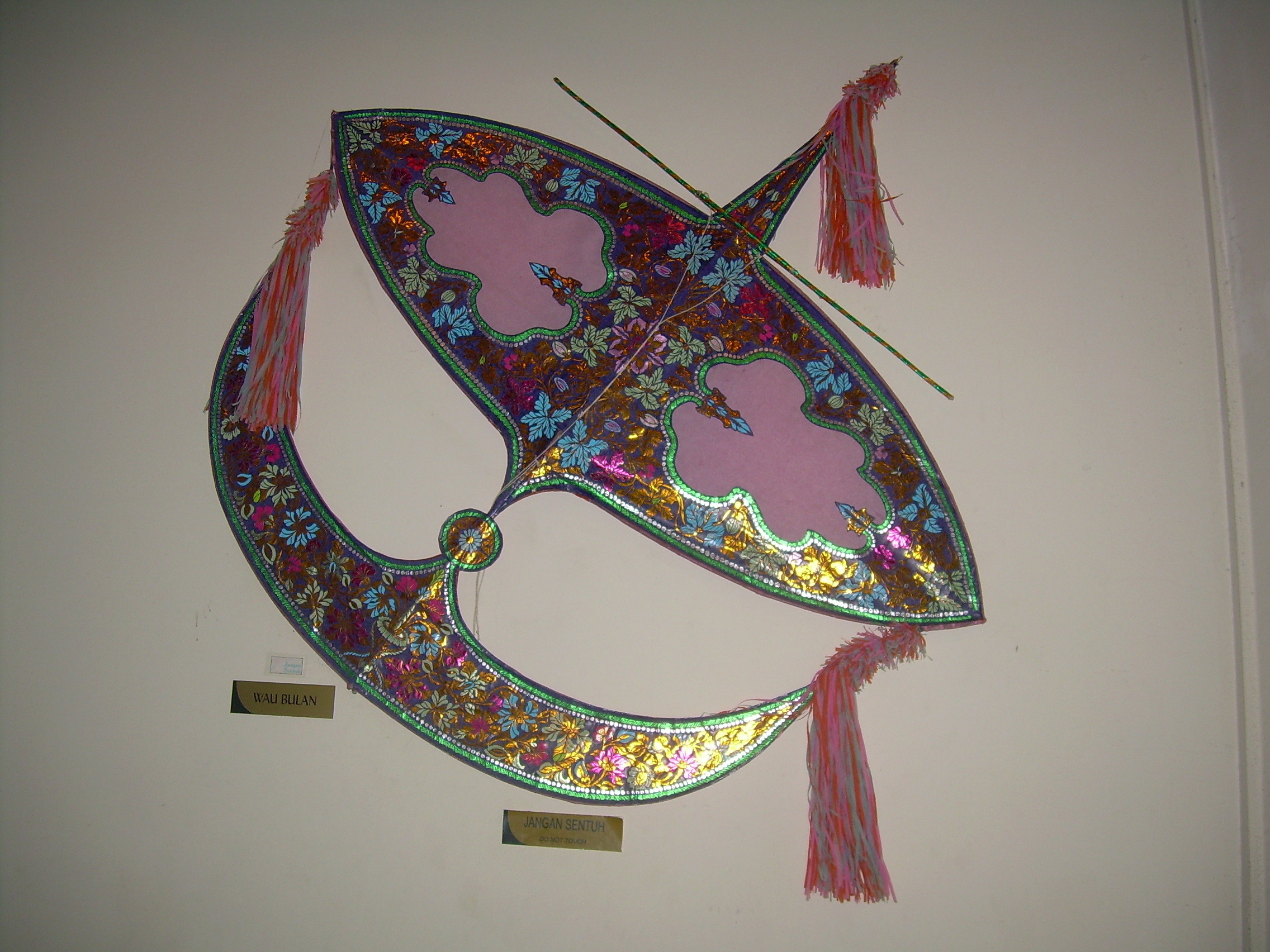
Wau bulan on display in Pasir Gudang Kite Museum, Johor.

Wau bulan (Kelantanese: Wa bule; Jawi: واو بولن; lit. 'moon kite') is an intricately designed Malaysian kite (normally with floral motifs) that is traditionally flown in the Malaysian state of Kelantan. It is one of Malaysia's national symbols, some others being the hibiscus. The reverse side of the fifty-cent coin of Malaysia (1989 series) features an intricately decorated wau bulan with a hummer on top. The logo of Malaysia Airlines (MAS) is based on the wau kucing (lit. 'cat kite').

There are many types of wau in Malaysia, each with its own specialty. Wau kucing and wau merak (peacock kite) are some of the variants.

The wau bulan is the subject of a popular dikir barat song, 'Wau Bulan' (Kelantanese: E Wa Bule), which is widely associated with Kelantan.

== Characteristics ==
Wau bulan got its name from the crescent moon-like shape of its lower section (moon means "bulan" in Malaysian Malay). Given the right colour, wau bulan apparently resembles a rising crescent moon when flown.

The size of wau bulan is bigger than any other Malaysian traditional kite. The typical size is 2.5 meters in width and 3.5 meters in length. This makes the decorations painted on the kite's body to be visible when it is flown high in the air. To make it more distinctive, wau bulan is normally decorated with large, strong-coloured patterns. Some of these are ‘Sobek’, one of the more common patterns.

== Gallery ==
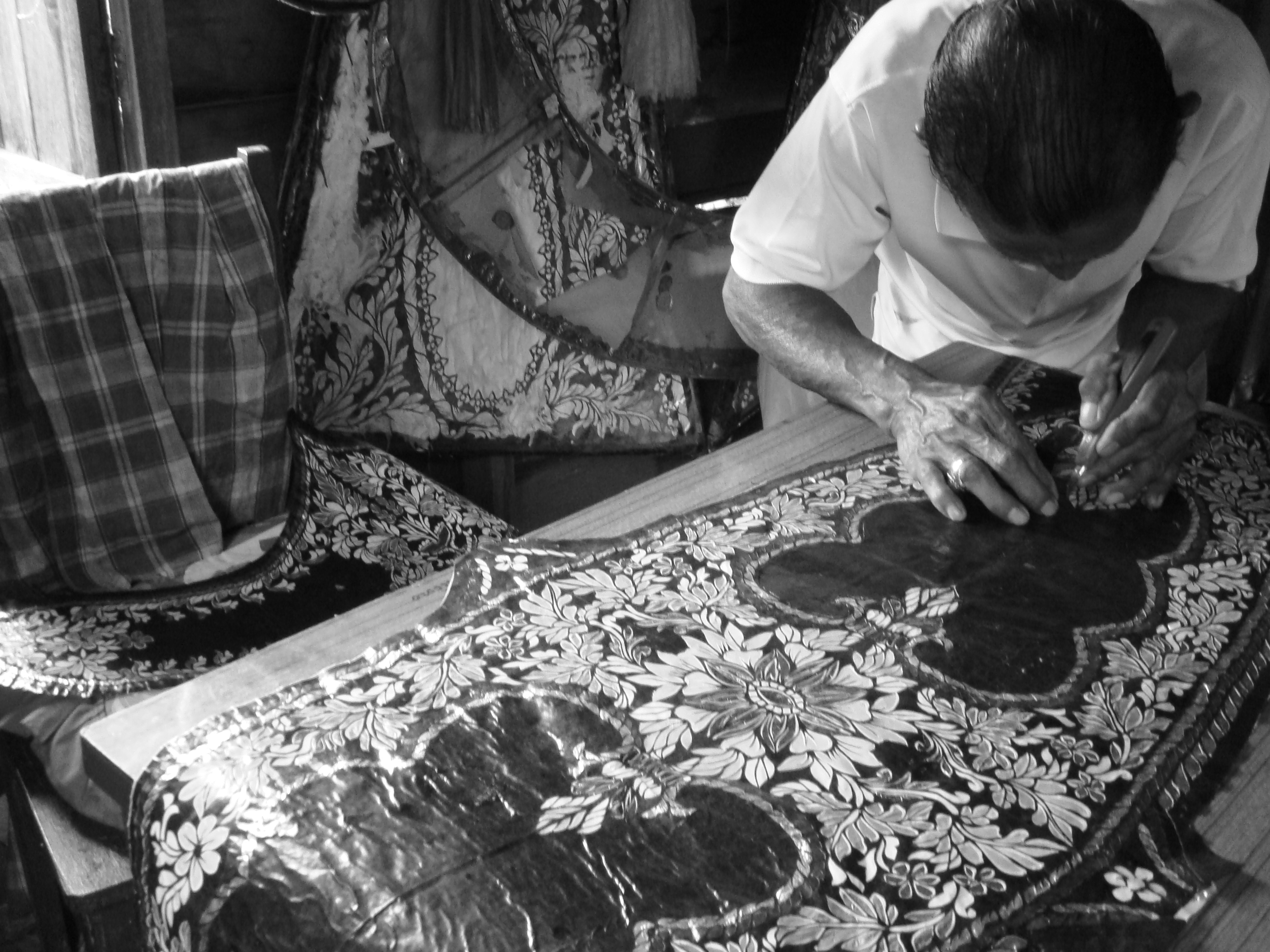
A wau-maker in his workshop. Design details in his wau are made by cutting various layers of coloured paper. The cutting is done spontaneously.

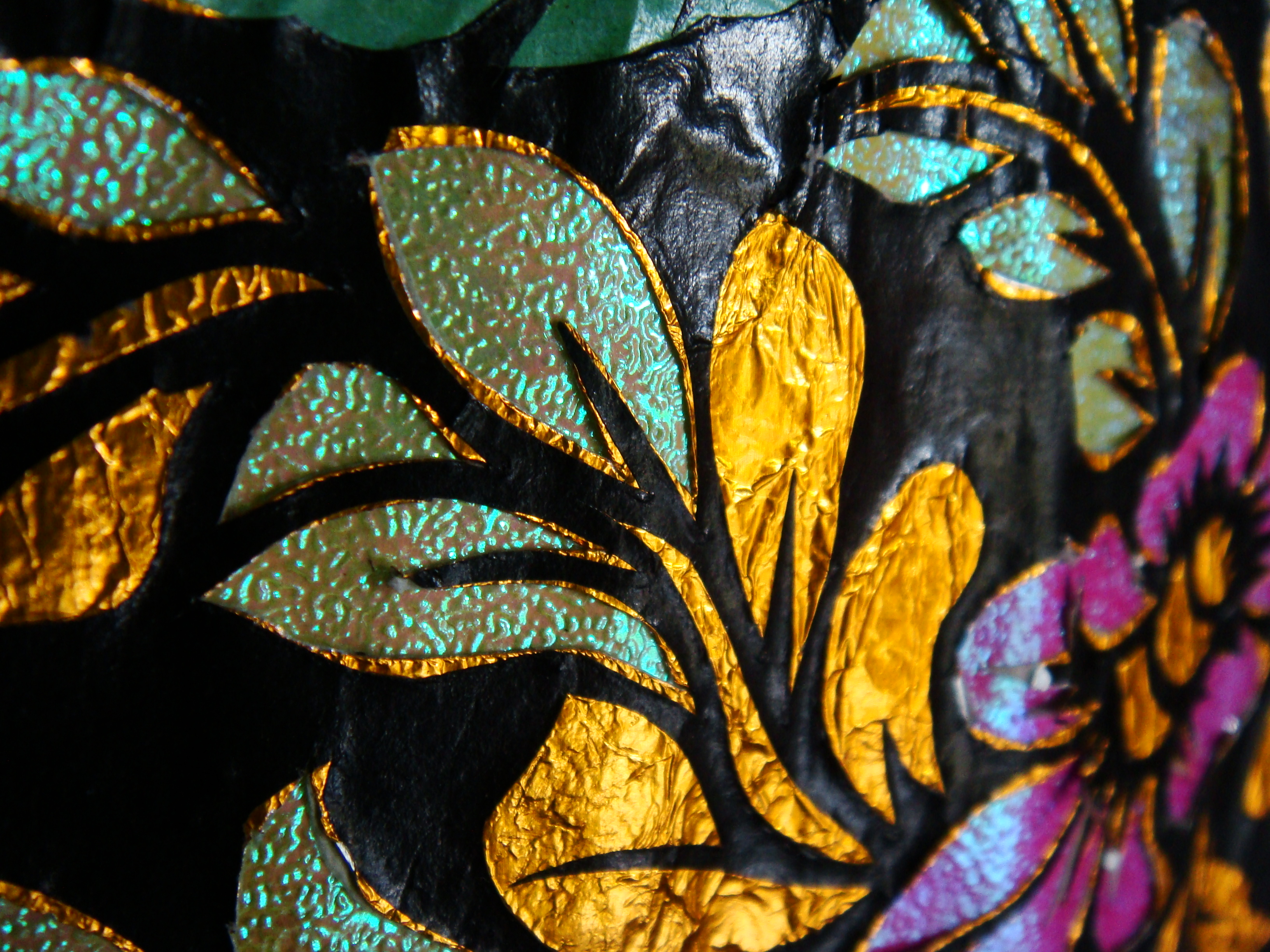
Close-up of a design on a wau.

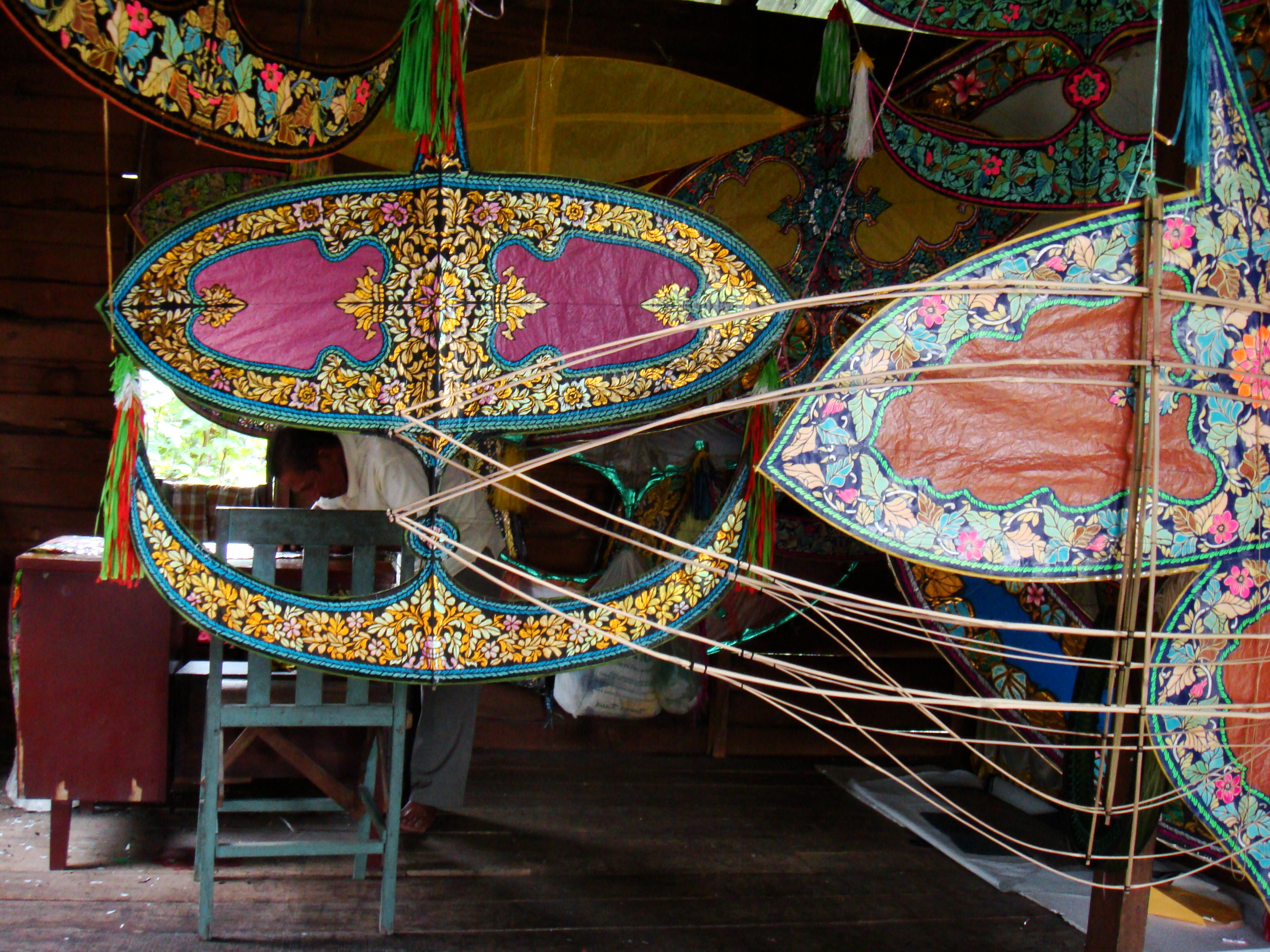
A wau-maker's workshop. Foreground: Wau frames. Background: A completed wau. Further background: The wau-maker.

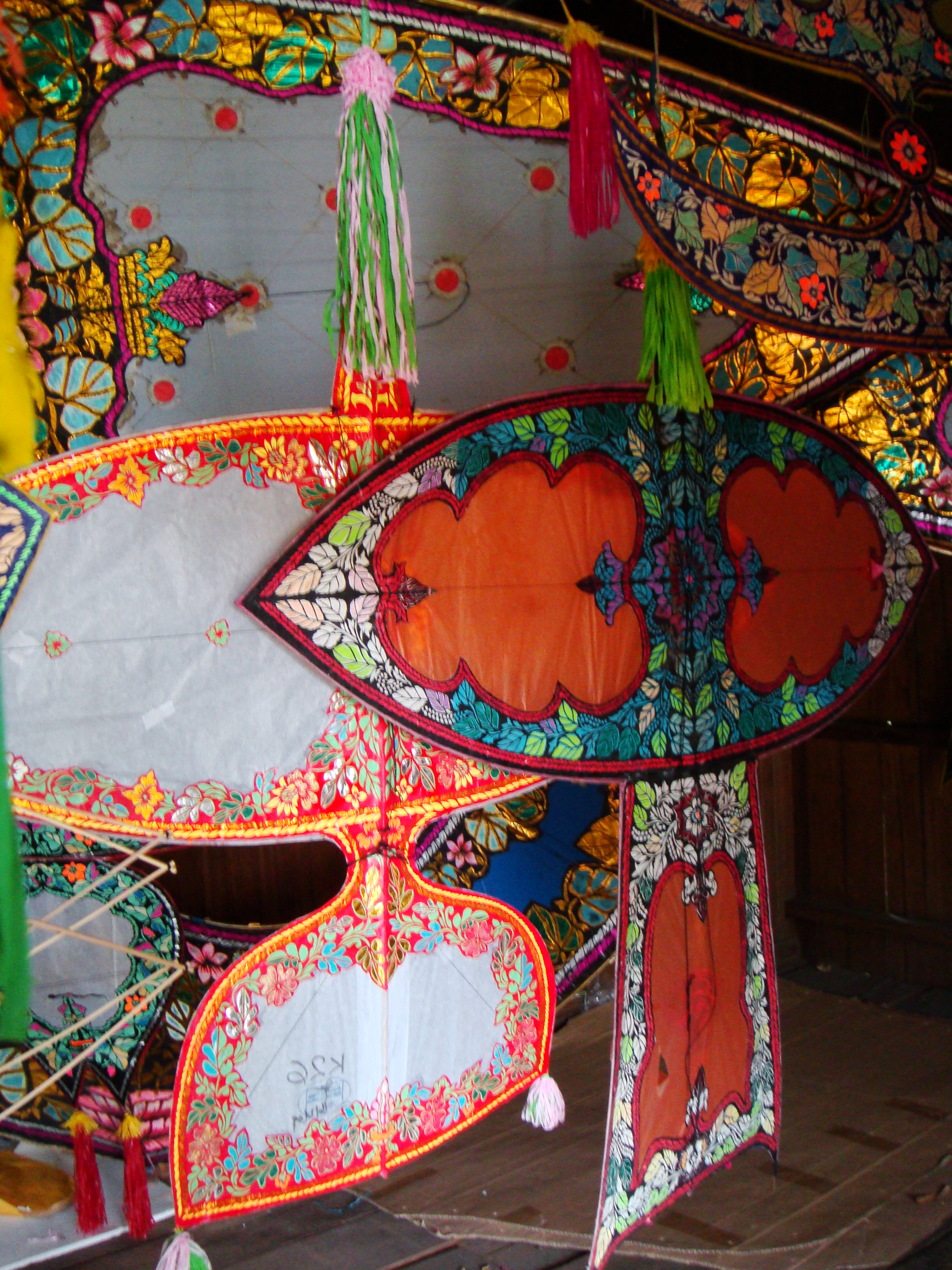
Example of other types of wau. They are differentiated by the shape of the bottom wing.

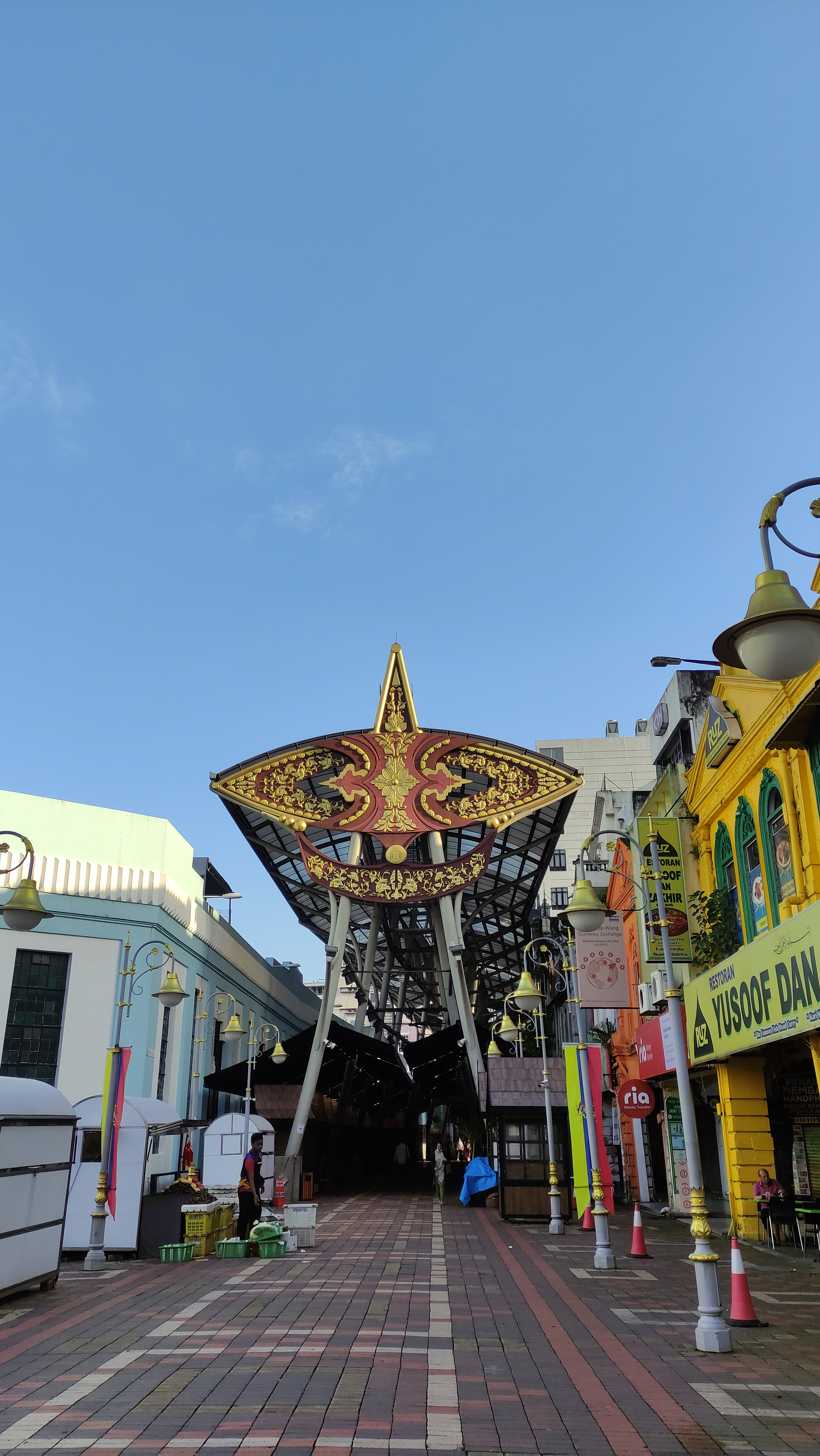
Ornaments in the shape of 'wau bulan', decorate the streets at Central Market, Kuala Lumpur.
