= Basis risk =

Risk that a hedge and its underlying asset do not move perfectly together

Basis risk in finance is the risk associated with imperfect hedging due to the variables or characteristics that affect the difference between the futures contract and the underlying "cash" position. It arises because of the difference between the price of the asset to be hedged and the price of the asset serving as the hedge before expiration, namely b = S - F. Barring idiosyncratic influence by the other aspects to be enumerated just below, by the time of expiration this simple difference will be eliminated by arbitrage. The other aspects that give rise to basis risk include:

1. Quality (grade) arising when the hedge in place has a different grade which is not perfectly correlated with the basis;
2. Timing arising due to mismatch between the expiration date of the hedge asset and the actual selling date of the underlying asset;
3. Location (leading to Transportation Costs) arising due to the difference in the location of the asset being hedged and the asset serving as the hedge, and which typically includes a premium to cover the risk these transportation costs may rise, causing a negative impact on the hedger.

== Definition ==
Under these conditions, the spot price of the asset and the futures price do not converge on the expiration date of the future. The amount by which the two quantities differ measures the value of the basis risk. That is,

Basis = Spot price of hedged asset - Futures price of contract.

Basis risk is not to be confused with another type of risk known as price risk.

== Examples ==
Some examples of basis risks are:

1. Treasury bill futures being hedged by two year bonds, there lies the risk of not fluctuating as desired.
2. A foreign currency exchange rate (FX) hedge using a non-deliverable forward contract (NDF): the NDF fixing might vary substantially from the actual available spot rate on the market on fixing date.
3. Over-the-counter (OTC) derivatives can help minimize basis risk by creating a perfect hedge. This is because OTC derivatives can be tailored to fit the exact risk needs of a hedger.

== See also ==
- Financial risk
- Financial risk management
- List of finance topics
- Uncertainty
