= Chennekothapalle =

- Village
- Interactive map of Chennekothapalle
- Location in Andhra Pradesh, India
- Coordinates: 14°19′03″N 77°36′26″E
- Country: India
- State: Andhra Pradesh
- District: Sri Sathya Sai
- Talukas: Chennekothapalle

Population (2011)
  - Total: 7,387

Languages
  - Official: Telugu
- Time zone: UTC+5:30 (IST)
- Vehicle registration: AP

Chennekothapalle is a village in Sri Sathya Sai district of the Indian state of Andhra Pradesh. It is the headquarters of Chennekothapalle mandal in Dharmavaram revenue division.

== Demographics ==
As of 2011 census, the village had a population of 7,387. The total population constitutes 3,752 males and 3,635 females —a sex ratio of 969 females per 1000 males. 749 children are in the age group of 0–6 years, of which 375 are boys and 374 are girls —a ratio of 997 per 1000. The average literacy rate stands at 66.51% with 4,415 literates, significantly higher than the state average of 67.41%.
