= Pallanguzhi =

South Indian board game

Pallankuli
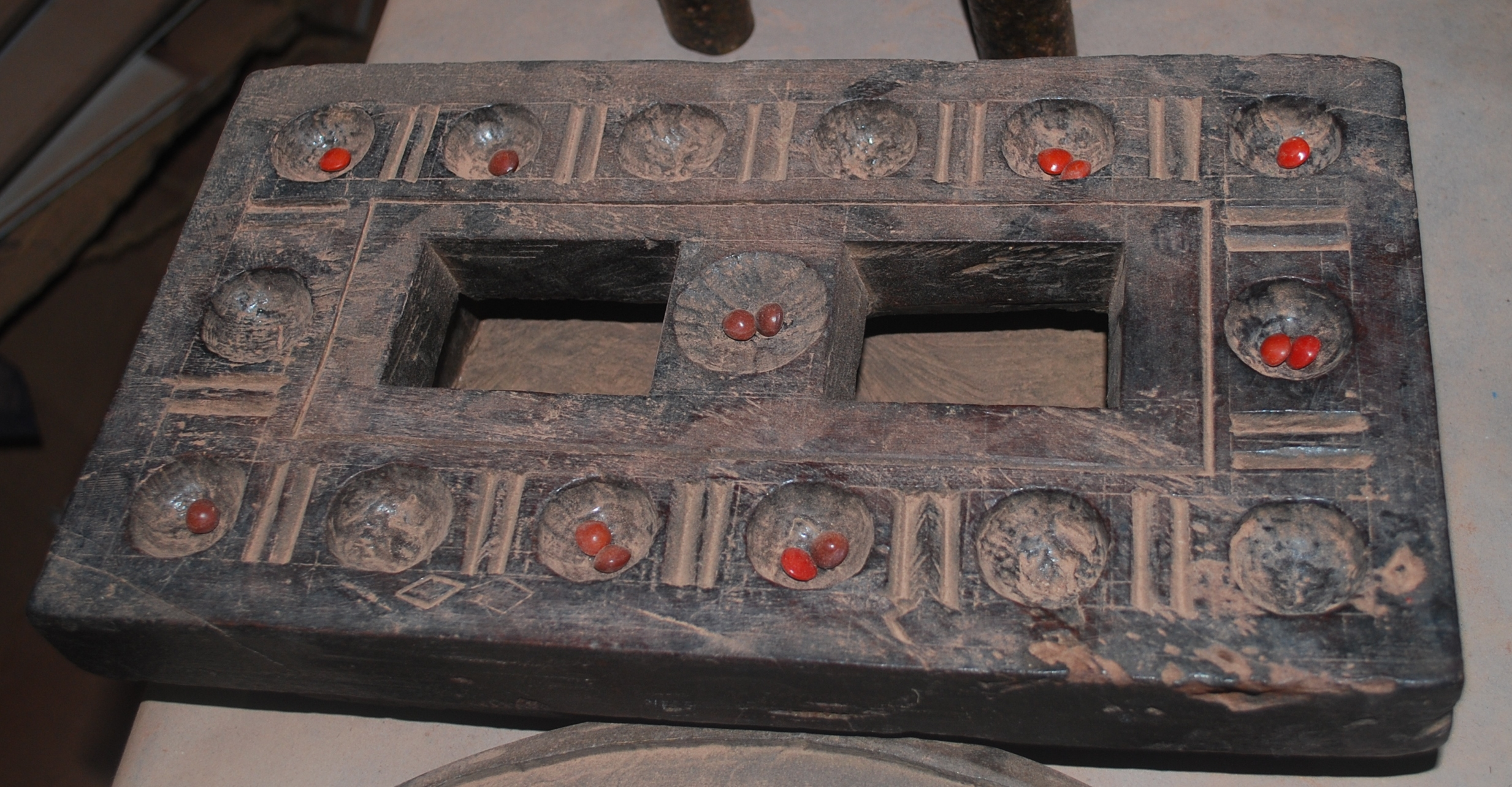
- A typical metal pallankuli board with 14 cups and 146 shells.
- Players: 2
- Setup time: 10–60 seconds
- Playing time: 1 minute – 7 hours*
- Age range: 5+
- Skills: Quick Mathematics

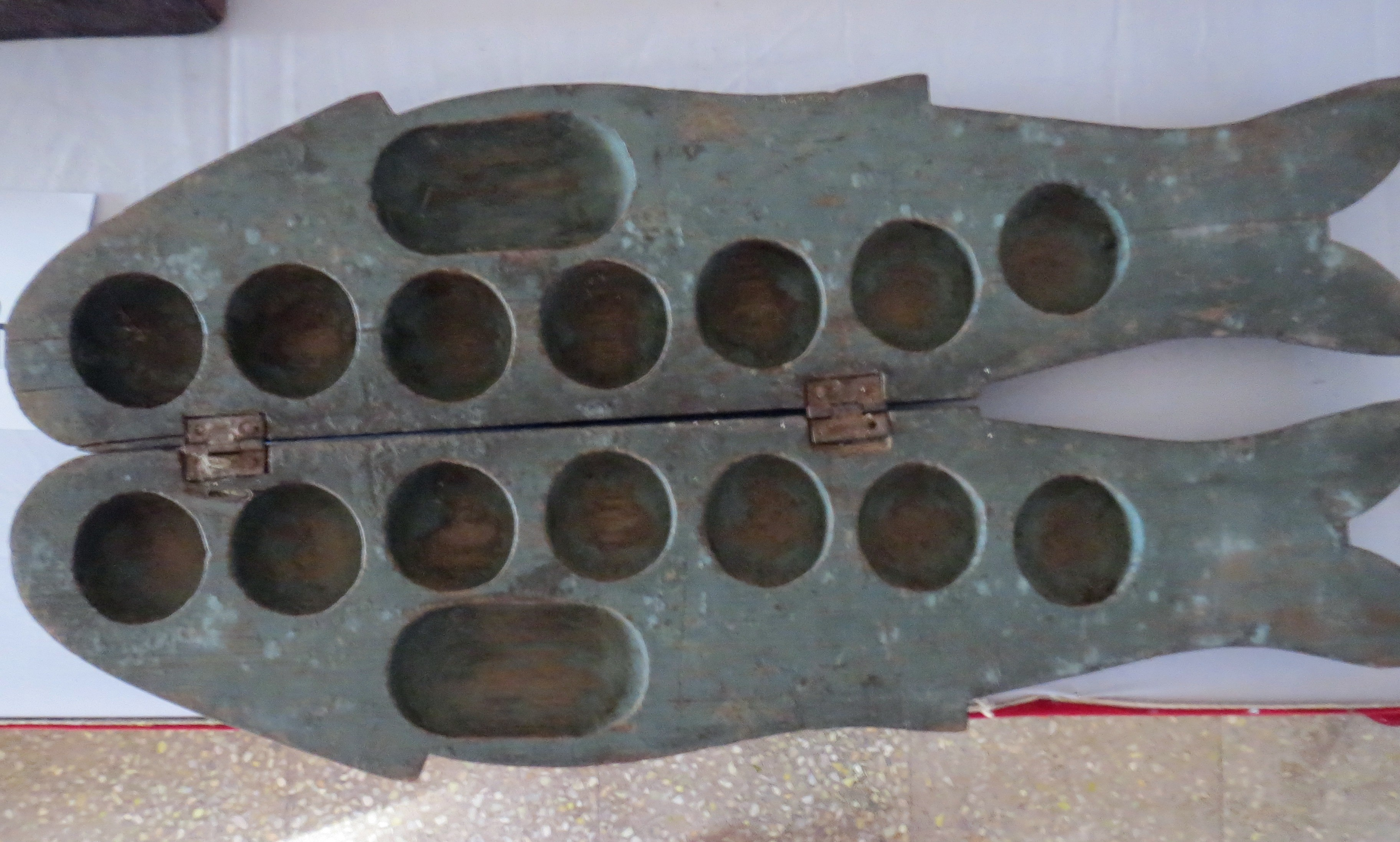
A fish shaped pallankuli board

Pallanguli, or Pallankuli (Tamil: பல்லாங்குழி, romanized: Pallāṅkuḻi, Malayalam: പല്ലാങ്കുഴി, romanized: Pallāṅkuḻi, Kannada: ಅಳಗುಳಿ ಮನೆ, romanized: Alaguli Mane, Telugu: వామన గుంటలు, romanized: Vamana guntalu, Odia: କଶାଡ଼ି, romanized: Kasāṛi, Marathi: सत्कोलि, romanized: Satkoli), is a traditional ancient mancala game played in South India, especially Tamil Nadu and Kerala. This game was later introduced to Karnataka and Andhra Pradesh in India, as well as Sri Lanka and Malaysia. The game is played by two players, with a wooden board that has fourteen pits in all (hence, it is also called fourteen pits, or pathinālam kuḻi. There have been several variations in the layout of the pits, one among them being seven pits on each player's side. The pits contain cowry shells, seeds or small pebbles used as counters. There are several variations of the game depending on the number of shells each player starts with.

== Gameplay ==
=== Overview ===
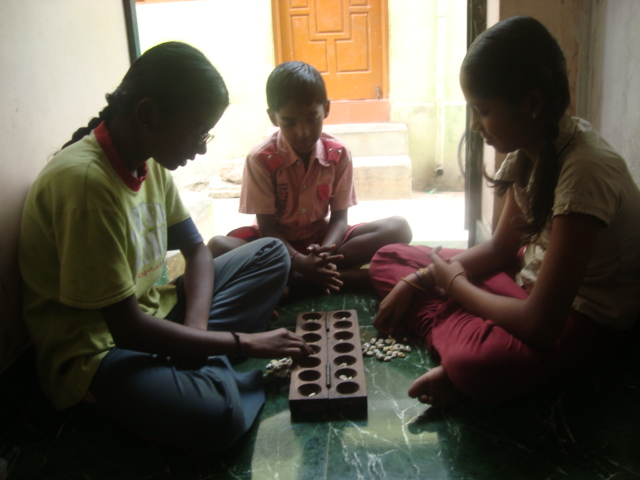
Girls playing Pallankuli

Pallankuli is played on a rectangular board with 2 rows and 7 columns. There are a total of 14 cups (kuḻi in Tamil) and 148 counters. For the counters in the game, seeds, shells, small stones are all common for use. As the game proceeds, each player distributes the shells over all the pits. The players may capture the shells, as permitted by the rules of the game. The rules of capture depend on the variant of the game played. The game ends when one of the players captures all the shells, and is declared as a winner.

12 counters are placed in each cup except the middle of each row into which only 2 counters are placed. The starting player lifts the counters from any of his holes and, going counter-clockwise, distributes one counter in each hole. If he reaches the end of his cups he goes on his opponent's side of the board. When the player drops his last counter, he takes the counter from the next cup and continues placing them in this way. If the last counter falls into a cup with an empty cup beyond, the counters in the cup beyond the empty hole are captured by the player and put into his store. That player then continues play from the next cup containing counters. If the last counter falls into a cup with two empty holes beyond, he captures no counters and his turn is over. The next player continues play in the same way, taking counters from any of his cups and going around placing counters in a counter-clockwise direction.

If, after having a counter dropped into it, a cup contains 6 counters, those become the property of the player who dropped the counter (pasu in Tamil). The round is over when no counters remain.

Once the first round is over players take the counters from their stores and fill as many of their holes as possible with counters. The winner will have a surplus of counters which are kept in his store. The loser of the first round will be unable to fill all of his holes. These unfilled holes are marked as "rubbish holes". In the next round play continues as before, but without the rubbish holes being included and the player who went first in the previous round going second.

During the game if a player has enough counters to fill any of his rubbish holes back up their status is removed and they are again used during play. The game is over when a player is unable to fill any cups with six counters at the end of a round.

=== Objects ===
Tamarind seeds and cowry shells (Soḻi (சோழி) in Tamil) are used in this game, to fill the holes of the Alli gulli board.

=== Popularity ===
This game is popular among the older generations of people. This game is also encouraged for the kids to learn to count, to improve eye–hand coordination and concentration while playing. Older people of the house play this game as a pastime with the young members of their family.

Pallankuli is also played in Sri Lanka, Trinidad, Guyana and Singapore, with a sizable Tamil-Indian population living in those countries.

Ancient Tamils, during their Chola expedition, and trade with the islands of the Philippines, Sumatra and Java, introduced this game to Indonesia and the Philippines. In Indonesia, this is known as Congkak or Congklakin, and in the Philippines, it is known as sungkâ.

== See also ==
- Congkak Indonesia
- Aadu puli attam
- Ali Guli Mane
- Mancala
- Oware
- List of mancala games
