= Southeast Asian mancala =

Count-and-capture board game

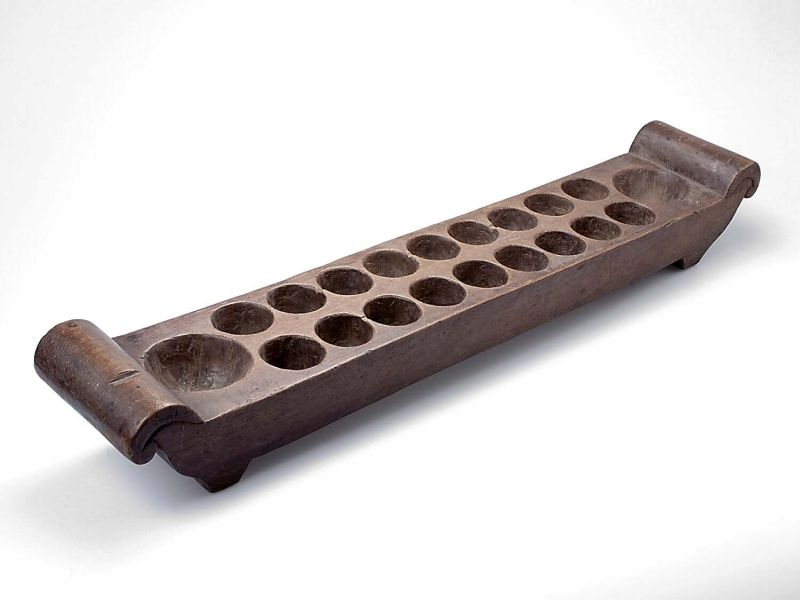
The Congklak Gameboard from Indonesia c. 1900

Southeast Asian mancalas are a subtype of mancala games predominantly found in Southeast Asia. They are known as congkak in Malaysia; congklak (VOS Spelling: tjongklak), congkak, congka, and dakon in Indonesia and Brunei; sungkâ in the Philippines; and Makkhum หมากขุม or Maklum หมากหลุม (Hole Game) in Thailand. They differ from other mancala games in that the player's store is included in the placing of the seeds. Like other mancalas, they vary widely in terms of the rules and number of holes used.

== Names ==
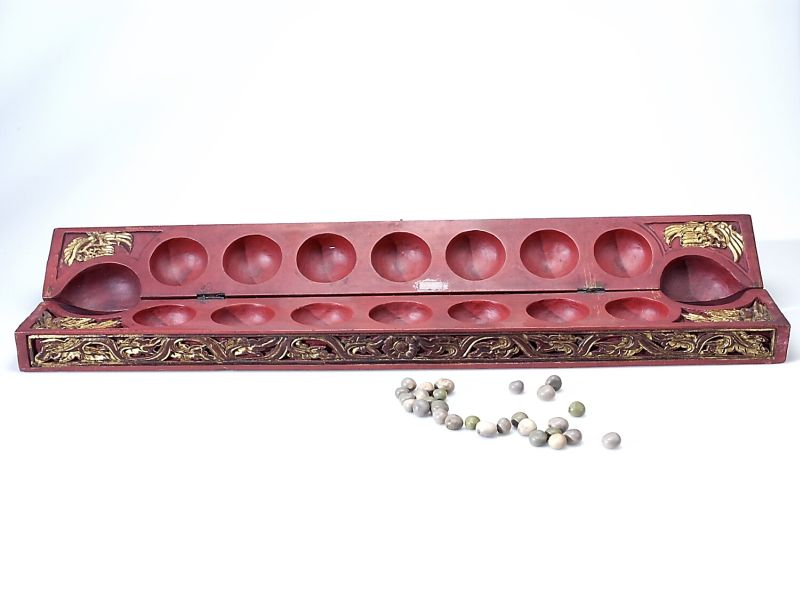
Ornate folding congklak from Indonesia with pebble seeds

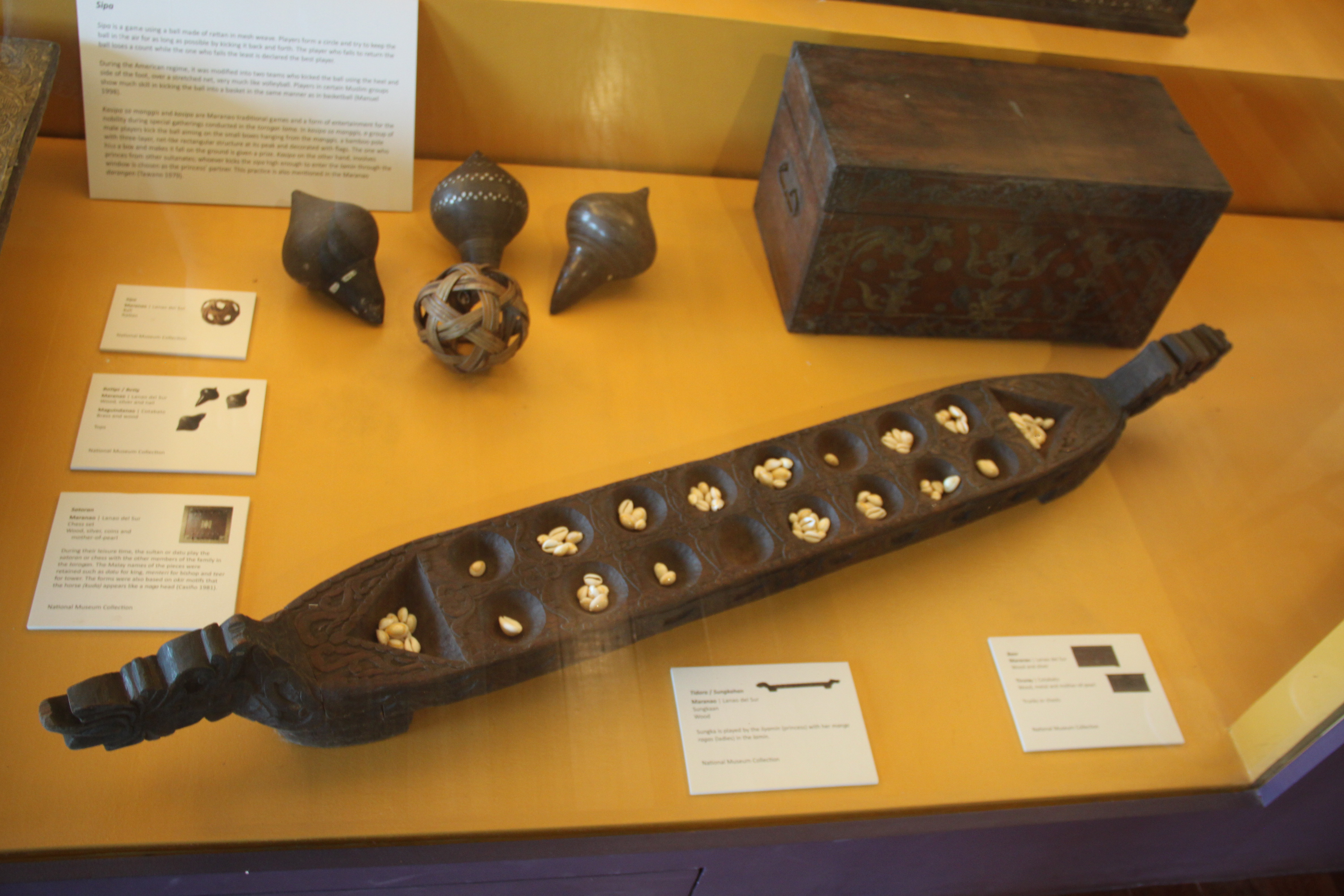
Filipino boat-shaped sungkâ with cowrie shell seeds, along with sipà (rattan wicker ball) and kakasing (tops)

Southeast Asian mancalas are generally known by variations of similar cognates which are likely onomatopoeiac. The names have also come to mean the cowrie shells, predominantly used as the seeds of the game. These names include congkak in Malaysia, congklak (VOS Spelling: tjongklak; also spelled as tsjongklak in Dutch sources), congkak, congka, and jogklak in Indonesia, Brunei, and Singapore, and sungkâ (also spelled chonca or chongca by Spanish sources) in the Philippines.

Historical records show that similar games also existed in Sri Lanka (where it is known as chonka) and India. In Tamil Nadu, India, it is known as Pallanguzhi. A similar game is still found in the Maldives, where it is known as ohlvalhu (where valhu means "eight", so literally "eight holes"). It has also spread to the Marianas (where it is known as chongka) and Taiwan via relatively recent Filipino migrations.

Other names for the game include dakon or dhakon (Javanese), kunggit (Philippines), dentuman lamban (Lampung), mokaotan, maggaleceng, aggalacang or nogarata (Sulawesi), and naranj (Maldives).

== History ==
The oldest mancala game boards were found in a ruined fort of Roman Egypt and date back to the 4th century AD. The original route of dispersal of mancalas into Southeast Asia is unknown. It may have originally entered Southeast Asia via Austronesian trading routes with South Asia.

Indonesia has the largest variation of Southeast Asian mancalas and thus may be likely to be at least one of the major entry points, though this may also be just an artifact of the country's size. Where the characteristic Southeast Asian ruleset originates from is still unknown.

== Description ==
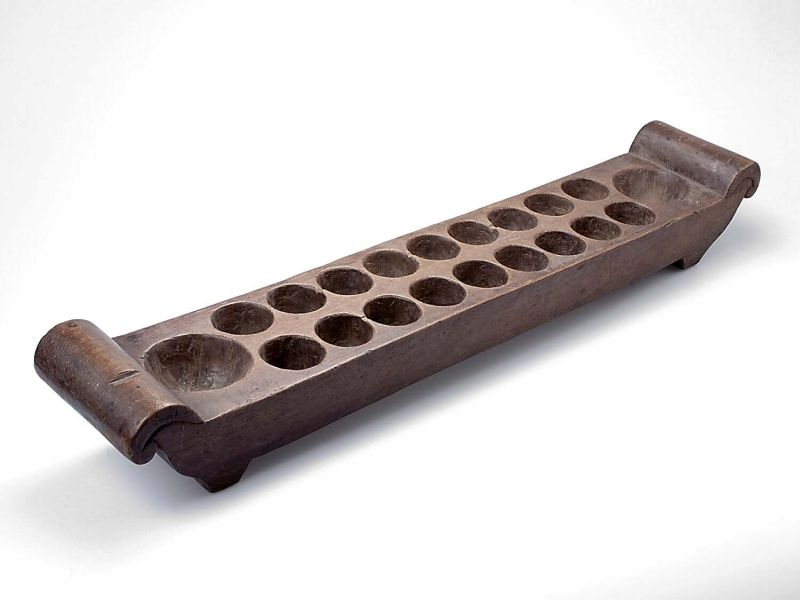
An Indonesian congklak with two sets of nine instead of seven

Southeast Asian mancalas are played by two people on carved wooden elongated boat-shaped boards with cup-shaped holes. Most variants have two sets of seven holes for each player, plus two larger holes at each end which are known as the "stores" of the players. However, the number of holes can vary, ranging from three to nine or more (excluding the stores), and these variants (which can also differ in the rules) can coexist in one area.

Mancala games are played with "seeds" or "counters", which are usually made from small cowrie shells, pebbles, or tamarind seeds. The holes in Southeast Asian mancalas are typically deeper and larger than variants in mainland Asia and Africa, since the seeds used are larger. A total of 98 pieces are used in the seven-hole board version.

In Malaysia, the holes are called lubang ("hole"), while the larger store holes are called rumah ("house"). In Indonesia, the holes are called anak ("child"), while the larger store holes are called indung ("mother"). In the Philippines, the holes are called bahay or balay ("house"), while the store hole is called ulo ("head").

== Rules ==
The rules for the most common seven-hole mancala versions in Malaysia, Brunei, Indonesia, the Maldives, Marianas, and the Philippines are almost identical. Each player controls the seven holes on the side of the board to their left and their score is the number of seeds in their store holes. Seven seeds are placed in each small hole except for the players' store hole. The objective of the game is to capture more seeds in the store than one's opponent.

Both players begin simultaneously by scooping up all the seeds in any hole on their side. Each drops a seed into the next hole and continues clockwise depositing one seed into every hole thereafter. A player drops a seed into their store each time they pass it but does not deposit any into their opponent's store.

How the game continues, depends on where the last seed of each scoop is deposited.

- If the seed drops into the player’s own store: the player scoops up the seeds from any of their holes and distributes them in the holes round the board but not in their opponent's store.
- If the seed drops into a hole (on either side of the board) containing seed: The player scoops up all of the seeds in that hole and continues distributing them as described above.
- If the seed drops into an empty hole belonging to the player: the player is entitled to collect the seeds in their opponent's store directly opposite their own. These seeds collected from their opponent's holes together with their last seed are deposited in their own store. If the opponent's store opposite their own is empty, they deposit only their last seed in their own store. They forfeit their turn and stop playing. It is the opponent's turn now to distribute the seeds.
- If the seed drops into an empty hole belonging to the opponent: the player forfeits their turn and stops playing. They also forfeit their seeds and leave it in the opponent's hole. It is the opponent's turn now to distribute the seeds.

The first round ends when a player has no more seeds in their holes. The remaining seeds are awarded to their opponent.

Play resumes in the second round with players redistributing seeds from their own store to their own holes. Beginning from left to right, seven seeds are placed in each hole. If a player does not have sufficient seeds to fill their own holes, the remaining holes are left empty and are considered 'burnt'. The leftover seeds are deposited into their own store. The opponent deposits excess seeds they have won into their own store.

The loser gets to start the second round. Play is continued as before but players will bypass 'burnt' holes and no seeds are to be dropped into these holes. If a seed is accidentally dropped into a 'burnt' holes, it is confiscated and stored in the opponent's store.

Play continues until one player loses all of their holes or concedes defeat.

== Cultural significance ==
The game is regarded as useful for developing certain mathematical principles.

The second series Malaysian Ringgit 10 sen coin has a Congkak board on the reverse in recognition of the long history of congkak in Malaysia.

== Dakon stones ==
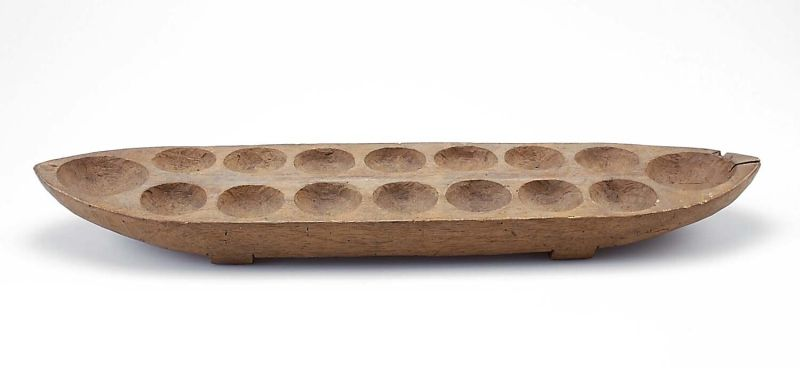
A boat-shaped dakon in Java which is actually a name for a Bronze to Iron Age rock tool

In Java, the term "dakon stone" refers to the similarly pitmarked stones from the bronze-iron age period of Indonesia. These stones have rows of 4 or 5 cup-shaped holes (called "cupules" in archaeology) and two holes at each end, a formation which has much in common with that of congklak. This prehistoric dakon stones is unrelated to the game and were probably employed in ceremonies to propitiate ancestors. Such stones can be found around Java.

Similar cup-shaped depressions are also found in other Austronesian cultures, most notably in Polynesia.

== See also ==
- Carrom
