= William Julius Champion Jr. =

American game designer

William "Willie" Julius Champion Jr. (June 15, 1880 – February 12, 1972) was the inventor of Kalah, a game in the Mancala family.

== Early life and family ==
William Julius Champion Jr. was born on June 15, 1880, in Trinidad, Colorado, to US Civil War veteran William Julius Champion Sr. and Elvira Hellen Gammons, a descendant of Mayflower passenger Thomas Rogers. Willie married Alice Viola Brown on June 15, 1908, in Boston, Massachusetts. He died on February 12, 1972.

== Education ==
Champion graduated cum laude from Yale University in the class of 1905 after walking from his childhood home in White Cloud, Michigan, to Yale's campus in New Haven, Connecticut (over 850 miles), and "earning all of his expenses" as he put it. His academic major was geology. The jobs he worked to pay for school included a sales agent for the Saturday Evening Post and a summer on the road with the Barnum and Bailey Circus (which later became the Ringling Brothers and Barnum and Bailey Circus).

== Professional life ==
Champion experienced wild swings in fortune throughout his long life. In addition to various business ventures and investments, he held full or partial interest in a gold mine in Colorado and the Champion lead mine in Niranda, Ontario, Canada. A local newspaper obituary called him a "radio pioneer", saying that after graduating from Yale, Champion moved to the Boston area and went to work with Lee DeForest, inventor of the vacuum tube, and goes on to say that he "helped set up and operate Boston's first radio transmitters".

== Kalah ==
Champion invented the board game of Kalah in 1940 and worked for years to popularize the game in the United States. He long held that the game had intrinsic educational value and held other benefits. Family history has it that in 1910 he first read about ancient mancala games, on which he based Kalah. He started manufacturing Kalah game sets in Mystic, Connecticut, about 1940 and later in Salem, Massachusetts, Brockton, Massachusetts, and finally Holbrook, Massachusetts, in around 1960.

== Extertal links ==
- Territorial census for Colorado 1885, Las Animas County
- Loring, Judith Cooper, (2004) Champion Family History - personal notes
- Curts, Boyd G. (editor, class secretary) (1930), History of the Class of 1905 (Yale)
- The Boston Globe, Saturday, December 7, 1962 page 23
- Melrose Free Press, December 19, 1963, "Kalah Recognized as Valuable Educational Aid - 350 Students Participate in Tournament"
