= Commodity risk =

Risk from commodity price fluctuations

Commodity risk refers to the uncertainties of future market values and of the size of the future income, caused by the fluctuation in the prices of commodities. These commodities may be grains, metals, gas, electricity etc. A commodity enterprise needs to deal with the following kinds of risks:

- Price risk is arising out of adverse movements in the world prices, exchange rates, basis between local and world prices. The related price area risk usually has a rather minor impact.
- Quantity or volume risk
- Cost risk (Input price risk)
- Political risk

== Groups at risk ==
There are broadly four categories of agents who face the commodities risk:

- production (farmers, plantation companies, and mining companies) face price risk, cost risk (on the prices of their inputs) and quantity risk
- Buyers (cooperatives, commercial traders and trait ants) face price risk between the time of up-country purchase buying and sale, typically at the port, to an exporter.
- Exporters face the same risk between purchase at the port and sale in the destination market; and may also face political risks with regard to export licenses or foreign exchange conversion.
- Governments face price and quantity risk with regard to tax revenues, particularly where tax rates rise as commodity prices rise (generally the case with metals and energy exports) or if support or other payments depend on the level of commodity prices.

== See also ==
- Fuel price risk management
- Sprott Molybdenum Participation Corporation
- Uranium Participation Corporation
