= 2025 African Youth Games =

Multi-sport event in Luanda, Angola

- Host: Luanda
- Country: Angola
- Nations: 51
- Athletes: 2,076 (1,059 Men and 1,017 Women)
- Events: 23 sports
- Opening: 10 December
- Closing: 20 December
- Ceremony venue: José Armando Sayovo Sports Complex, Caxito, Angola
- Website: jajangola2025.com

The 2025 African Youth Games were the 4th edition of the African multi-sport event, the African Youth Games. The award to Angola, as the first Portuguese-speaking host, was announced on 29 April 2025.

The games took place from 10 to 20 December 2025, in 33 sports in Luanda, Benguela, Lubango, Huambo, Moçâmedes and Caxito.

== Participating nations ==
51 Nations (Except Guinea-Bissau, Eritrea, Sudan):

- Algeria (151)
- Angola (165) (host)
- Benin
- Botswana
- Burkina Faso
- Burundi
- Cameroon
- Cape Verde
- Central African Republic
- Chad
- Comoros
- Republic of the Congo
- Ivory Coast
- Djibouti
- Democratic Republic of the Congo
- Egypt (86)
- Equatorial Guinea
- Ethiopia
- Gabon
- The Gambia
- Ghana
- Guinea
- Kenya
- Lesotho
- Liberia
- Libya
- Madagascar
- Malawi (3)
- Mali
- Mauritania
- Mauritius
- Morocco
- Mozambique
- Namibia
- Niger
- Nigeria
- Rwanda
- São Tomé and Príncipe
- Senegal
- Seychelles (4)
- Sierra Leone
- Somalia (3)
- South Africa (108)
- South Sudan
- Eswatini
- Tanzania
- Togo
- Tunisia (137)
- Uganda
- Zambia
- Zimbabwe

== Sports ==
1. 3x3 basketball
2. Athletics
3. Badminton
4. Beach handball
5. Beach volleyball
6. Beach wrestling
7. Boxing
8. Breaking
9. Canoeing
10. Cycling (BMX racing, Road)
11. Equestrian
12. Fencing
13. Golf
14. Judo
15. Karate
16. Swimming
17. Rowing
18. Table tennis
19. Taekwondo
20. Tennis
21. Weightlifting

Traditional Sports: Wela and Kiela.

== Medal table ==
Host nation

Rank	Nation	Gold	Silver	Bronze	Total
1	South Africa (RSA)	45	43	17	105
2	Algeria (ALG)	39	26	36	101
3	Egypt (EGY)	33	22	21	76
4	Tunisia (TUN)	27	28	38	93
5	Nigeria (NGR)	22	8	11	41
6	Cameroon (CMR)	14	5	7	26
7	Angola (ANG)*	9	24	17	50
8	Ethiopia (ETH)	8	8	14	30
9	Kenya (KEN)	7	12	14	33
10	Libya (LBA)	6	1	1	8
11	Senegal (SEN)	5	2	7	14
12	Zimbabwe (ZIM)	3	9	4	16
13	Ghana (GHA)	3	6	8	17
14	Seychelles (SEY)	3	6	1	10
15	(Democratic Republic of the Congo) DR Congo (COD)	3	1	1	5
16	Ivory Coast (CIV)	2	8	4	14
17	Niger (NIG)	2	4	3	9
18	Madagascar (MAD)	2	2	0	4
19	Morocco (MAR)	2	1	3	6
20	(Republic of the Congo) Congo (CGO)	2	1	2	5
21	Zambia (ZAM)	2	0	4	6
22	Sierra Leone (SLE)	2	0	0	2
22	São Tomé and Príncipe (STP)	2	0	0	2
24	Mauritius (MRI)	1	8	7	16
25	Namibia (NAM)	1	5	8	14
26	Botswana (BOT)	1	3	5	9
27	Eritrea (ERI)	1	0	1	2
28	Eswatini (SWZ)	0	4	3	7
29	Burundi (BDI)	0	2	0	2
29	Rwanda (RWA)	0	2	0	2
31	Burkina Faso (BUR)	0	1	4	5
32	The Gambia (GAM)	0	1	3	4
32	Uganda (UGA)	0	1	3	4
34	Djibouti (DJI)	0	1	2	3
34	Gabon (GAB)	0	1	2	3
36	Togo (TOG)	0	1	1	2
37	Guinea (GUI)	0	0	5	5
38	Mozambique (MOZ)	0	0	4	4
39	Liberia (LBR)	0	0	3	3
40	Benin (BEN)	0	0	1	1
40	Central African Republic (CAF)	0	0	1	1
40	Mali (MLI)	0	0	1	1
Totals (42 entries)		247	247	267	761

== See also ==
- 2025 African School Games
- 2024 African Games
