= Jorge Silva =

Jorge Silva or Jorge da Silva may refer to:

- Jorge Silva Somarriva (1871–1963), Chilean politician
- Jorge Silva Guerra (1897–1973), Chilean politician
- Jorge Silva (director) (1941–1987), Colombian film maker, co-directed with wife Marta Rodriguez
- Jorge Nuno Silva (born 1956), Portuguese mathematician
- Jorge Silva (footballer, born 1959), Portuguese football striker
- Jorge da Silva (born 1961), Uruguayan football striker
- Jorge Silva (Brazilian boxer) (born 1966), Brazilian boxer
- Jorge da Silva (athlete) (born 1966), Brazilian Olympic athlete
- Jorge Silva Puras (born 1966), Puerto Rican public servant
- Jorge Silva (footballer, born 1972), Portuguese football goalkeeper
- Jorge Silva (footballer, born 1975), Portuguese football defender
- Jorge Silva (footballer, born 1996), Portuguese football defender
