= Alexander de Voogt =

Dutch researcher and Professor

Alexander Johan de Voogt or simply Alex de Voogt (Baarn, 1970–) is a Dutch researcher and Professor at Drew University, who worked as a curator of African Ethnology at the American Museum of Natural History and best known for his work on the history and distribution of traditional mancala games. He is also editor of Board Game Studies, the main scientific journal on the history of board games.

De Voogt began studying mancala in the 1990s, while he was in Zanzibar studying Swahili. At the time, he began analyzing the rules and strategies of the Bao mancala game (one of the most complex mancala games) by interviewing acknowledged Zanzibari "Bao masters". In 1995 he published his PhD thesis Limits of the Mind: Towards a Characterization of Bao Mastership where he analyzed the intellectual abilities required to master the Bao game.

The work on Bao set the basis for all subsequent research activities by De Voogt. Among the many mancala games De Voogt has been collecting information on and studying there are Katro (Madagascar), Owela (Namibia), Warri (Barbados), Hawalis (Oman), Ohvalhu (Maldives), Mangaley (Syria) and Olinda Keliya (Sri Lanka).

== Selected writings ==
- Limits of the mind: Towards a characterisation of the bao mastership, 1995
- New approaches to board games research: asian origins and future perspectives, 1995
- Mancala Board Games, British Museum Press, Londra 1997
- Seeded players: East African game of Bao, Natural History, New York, 1998.
- Distribution of mancala board games: A methodological Inquiry, «Board Games Studies» 2, 1999, pp. 104–114.
- (with H. H. L. M. Donkers and J. W. H. M Uiterwijk) Human versus machine problem-solving: Winning openings in Dakon, in «Board Games Studies», 3, pp. 79–88, 2000
- (with H. H. L. M. Donkers and J. W. H. M. Uiterwijk) Mancala games: Topics in mathematics and artificial intelligence, in Proceedings of the Colloquium Board Games in Academia IV, Fribourg: Edition Universitaire 2001, pp. 133–146.
- (with F. Gobet and J. Retschitzki) Moves in Mind: The Psychology of Board Games. Psychology Press, Hove 2004.
- "A question of excellence, a century of African masters". Africa World Press, Trenton NJ 2005.
- "Mancala games and their suitability for players with visual impairments", Journal of Visual Impairment and Blindness 104(11):725–731.
- (with W. Crist and A.-E. Dunn-Vaturi) "Ancient Egyptian at Play: Board Games Across Borders", Bloomsbury Academic Press, London, 2016.
