= 2010 African Youth Games =

Multi-sport event in Rabat, Morocco

- Nations: 40
- Athletes: 1008
- Events: 16 sports
- Opening: 13 July 2010
- Closing: 28 July 2010
- Opened by: Then, King Mohammed VI
- Ceremony venue: Moulay Abdellah Stadium, Rabat

The 1st African Youth Games took place in Rabat, Morocco's capital city from 13 to 18 July 2010. Participants are young African athletes, both girls and boys of 15–17 years. A total of 16 sports will be featured at the continental event including: athletics, basketball, boxing, fencing, football, gymnastics, judo, rowing, swimming, table tennis, taekwondo, tennis, swimming and gymnastics. The Games were organised by the ANOCA as a prelude to the 2010 Summer Youth Olympics, the first olympic youth games to be held in Singapore in August. Tunisia finished leader in the medal table standings.

== Sports ==
Sixteen sports were contested in this edition of African Youth Games.

- Athletics
- Basketball
- Boxing
- Canoeing
- Fencing
- Football
- Gymnastics
- Judo
- Karate
- Rowing
- Swimming
- Table tennis
- Taekwondo
- Tennis
- Weightlifting
- Wrestling
- Cycling

== Medal table ==
* Host nation (Morocco)

Rank	Nation	Gold	Silver	Bronze	Total
1	Tunisia (TUN)	33	9	7	49
2	Egypt (EGY)	30	19	6	55
3	Morocco (MAR)*	23	28	37	88
Totals (3 entries)		86	56	50	192
