= Kisolo =

Mancala board game

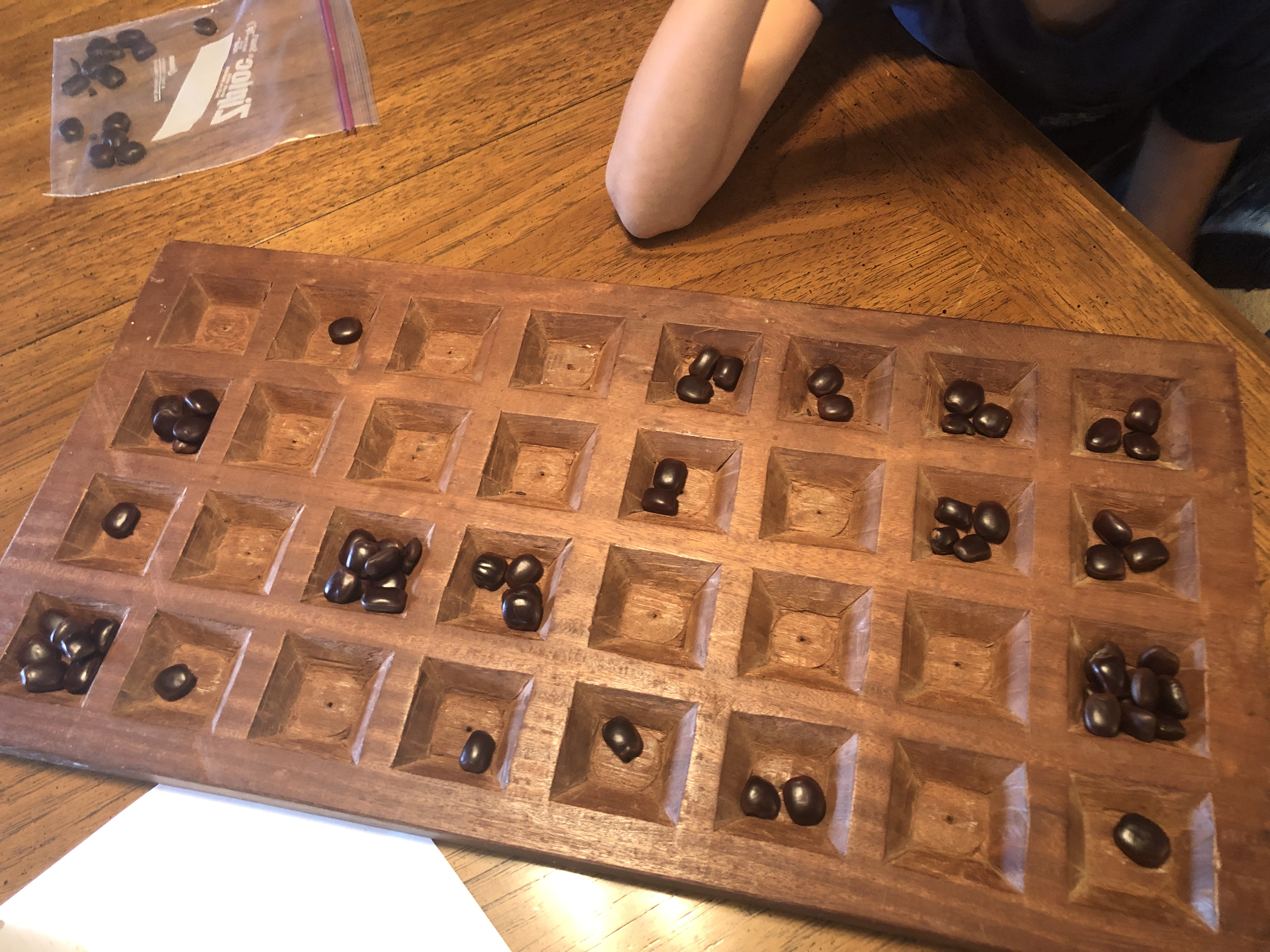
A hand made Kisolo 4×8 board 1965.

Kisolo (also spelled Chisolo) is a traditional mancala game played by the Luba, Lulua and Songye peoples of DR Congo, Zambia and Zimbabwe. It is closely related to other East African mancalas such as Bao, Bao Kiarabu, Coro and Isolo.

The board used to play Kisolo varies in size depending on common practice and region on the African continent . A board with 32 pits; 4×8 (i.e., 4 rows of 8 pits) is played in the northwestern region of Democratic Republic of Congo. The board in other regions may be is 4×7, i.e., 4 rows of 7 pits each, although there are also Kisolo boards that have 6 pits per row. At game setup, most normally 2 seeds are placed in each pit but some regions start with 3 seeds. Traditionally, seeds from the ngola tree (Pictantus makombo) or the menga tree (Canarium schweinfurtii) are used, or small stones.

The stones represent cattle.

== Rules ==
In North East Zambia (Ba-Bemba country), the game is played as follows.

Each player has two rows of holes (pits), each with two stones in it.

They take turns.

The first player starts by choosing a hole in their row nearest the opposition. They pick up both stones then moving clockwise they drop a stone into the next hole; on to the next hole and drops another stone there, etc., etc., until they drop the last stone into a hole. If there are stones in that hole, they pick them all up and repeat the process until the drop their last stone into an empty hole.

IF there is a stone in the opponent's front hole opposite, they then collect those stones and the ones in the back row hole, and continue on their way.

When they finally run out of stones, either in their back row or in an empty front hole with no opponent's stones in the front hole opposite, then it is their opponent's turn.

This continues until neither player can play, because they don't have a stone in their front row.

The winner is the one with most stones.
