= International Board Game Studies Association =

Academic professional association

The International Board Game Studies Association (IBGSA) is an academic professional association "devoted to the history and development of board games throughout the world". The IBGSA sponsors an annual scholarly conference, the BGSA Colloquium, as well as an academic peer-reviewed journal, Board Game Studies. The IBGSA's membership includes academics, museum curators, game designers, archivists, and collectors.

== History ==
The International Board Game Studies Association grew out of a colloquium organised by Dr Irving Finkel at the British Museum in 1990. A volume of papers related to this event was subsequently published by the British Museum Press as Ancient Board Games in Perspective. After the initial colloquium, Dr Alexander de Voogt, then of the University of Leiden in the Netherlands, convened a second colloquium, held at the University of Leiden in 1995. It was agreed by the members of the International Board Game Studies Association to meet biennially, and the next event was held at Leiden in 1997. An associated journal, sponsored by the University of Leiden, was established and the first volume of the Board Game Studies Journal was published in 1998.

The colloquium continued as a biennial forum, meeting in a different European city every two years, while the journal was published annually. From 2002, the colloquium became an annual event. The journal was discontinued as a physical publication after seven issues, but reconstituted as an online journal on the De Gruyter platform. The annual Board Game Studies Colloquium is now the largest and single most important academic conference related to the study of board games. It has occasionally been hosted outside Europe, but it now established as a European event.

=== BGSA Colloquium History ===
- 1995 Leiden, The Netherlands
- 1997 Leiden, The Netherlands
- 1999 Florence, Italy
- 2001 Fribourg, Switzerland
- 2002 Barcelona, Spain
- 2003 Marburg, Germany
- 2004 Philadelphia, PA, USA
- 2005 Oxford, UK
- 2006 Ouro Preto, Brazil
- 2007 St Pölten, Austria
- 2008 Lisbon, Portugal
- 2009 Jerusalem, Israel
- 2010 Paris, France
- 2011 Bruges, Belgium
- 2012 Munich, Bavaria
- 2013 Ponta Delgaa, Azores
- 2014 Ipswich, Suffolk
- 2015 La Tour de Peilz, Switzerland
- 2016 Nürnberg, Germany
- 2017 Copenhagen, Denmark
- 2018 Athens, Greece
- 2019 Bologna, Italy
- 2021 Paris, France
- 2022 Leeuwarden, The Netherlands
- 2023 Ephesus, Turkey
- 2024 Tampere, Finland
- 2025 Chemnitz, Germany
- 2026 Alicante, Spain

=== Editorial Board ===
- Jorge Nuno Silva, managing editor, University of Lisbon
- Alexander de Voogt, Museum of Natural History
- Carlos Pereira dos Santos, Centro de Estruturas Lineares e Combinatórias
- Fernanda Frazão, Apenas Livros
- Irving Finkel, British Museum
- João Pedro Neto, University of Lisbon
- Lídia Fernandes, Museu Romano
- Thierry Depaulis, Le Vieux Papier
- Ulrich Schaedler, fr:Musée suisse du jeu
