= Igisoro =

East african variant of mancala

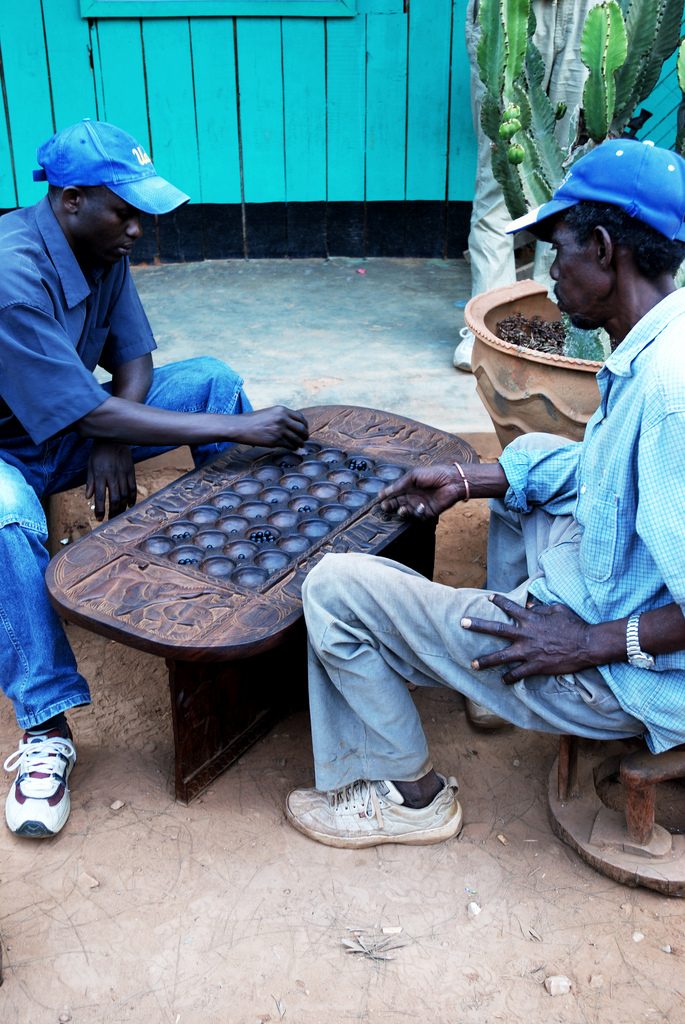
Igisoro (or Omweso) players in Kigali, Rwanda

Igisoro is a two-player variant of the mancala family. It is a variant of the Omweso game of the Baganda people (Uganda), and it is played primarily in Burundi and Rwanda. Igisoro, like Omweso and other mancalas from Eastern Africa, such as Bao, is played with a 4×8 board of pits and 64 seeds. A player's territory is the two rows of pits closest to them.

== Start ==
The usual starting position is shown below. Each player starts with 4 seeds in each pit in the back row of their territory. However, any player may decide to start with seeds in their front row, or with some seeds in either row depending on their wishes.

Empty	Empty	Empty	Empty	Empty	Empty	Empty	Empty
4	4	4	4	4	4	4	4
4	4	4	4	4	4	4	4
Empty	Empty	Empty	Empty	Empty	Empty	Empty	Empty

== Turns ==
On his turn, a player chooses a pit containing seeds in their territory and sows them placing one seed in each pit as they move counter-clockwise around their territory. The board below shows the state after the first player moved the seeds from the pit highlighted in yellow.

Empty	Empty	Empty	Empty	Empty	Empty	Empty	Empty
4	4	4	4	4	4	4	4
5	5	5	Empty (highlighted)	4	4	4	4
1	Empty	Empty	Empty	Empty	Empty	Empty	Empty

At the end of a turn, there are two ways in which the players turn may continue:

1. If the pit where the last seed is sown is not empty, the player picks up all seeds from this pit and begins to sow again, starting from the next pit.
2. If the pit where the last seed is sown is not empty and both opponent's opposite pits are not empty, the player may pick up all seeds from these two pits and begins to sow again. When the player chooses to pick up their opponents seeds, the sowing begins again from the pit where the player originally began their turn, thus sowing seeds in the same pits as the original move. If the player in his turn chooses not to pick up his opponents seeds, they have to say it: "I pass" (ndahise). The opponent may reply "I retreat" (ndakubye) and then immediately retreat the seeds that were not picked, by picking the seeds in their pit at the front row and adding them to the adjacent pit in the last row. This is done while the other player is still sowing.

Only for a direct pick or catch, a player starting from, or arriving at the pits highlighted in yellow below may choose to move clockwise. Starting from any other pit, they may only move counter-clockwise.

Empty (highlighted)	Empty	Empty	Empty	Empty	Empty	Empty	Empty (highlighted)
Empty	Empty (highlighted)	Empty	Empty	Empty	Empty	Empty (highlighted)	Empty
Empty	Empty (highlighted)	Empty	Empty	Empty	Empty	Empty (highlighted)	Empty
Empty (highlighted)	Empty	Empty	Empty	Empty	Empty	Empty	Empty (highlighted)

== Completion ==
The game is over and a player has lost when they cannot sow any of their seeds.
