= African School Games =

International multi-sports competition

- Abbreviation: ASG
- Frequency: Every 2 years
- Inaugurated: 2025

The African School Games is an international multi-sport event held every two years.

The first games was hosted by Algeria in four cities. This international sportive event organize by the Association of National Olympic Committees of Africa. The final football game was held at the Abdelkader Chabou Stadium, which was won by Algeria, the host country.

== Editions ==
Host cities of the African Youth Games

Games	Year	Host city	Host country	Opened by	Start Date	End Date	Nations	Athletes	Sports	Top Country On Medal Table
I	2025	Algeria (4 cities)	Algeria	Walid Sadi (Minister of Youth & Sports)	26 July	5 August	50	1500	21	Algeria
II	2027		Nigeria	Future event						
III	2029		Kenya	Future event						

== See also ==
- African Games
- African Youth Games
- African Military Games
