= Isolo =

Variant of mancala

Isolo (also known as Isumbi) is a traditional mancala game played by the Sukuma people in northern Tanzania. The rules of the game come in three variants, respectively for women, boys and men.

== Equipment ==
The board used to play Isolo (also known as isolo) comprised 4 rows of 8 pits each, and 64 seeds (usually Caesalpinia bonduc seeds) are used; the equipment is thus the same as that of many other East African mancalas such as Bao and Omweso. Also as in Bao and Omweso, each player controls half of the board (two rows). Some Isolo boards feature two larger pits that are not part of the game but might be used to keep the score.

== Rules ==
=== Rules for women ===
At game setup, two seeds are placed in each pit.

At her turn, the player takes the seeds from any of her pits holding two or more seeds, and sows them counterclockwise in her two rows. If the last seed falls in an empty pit, the turn is over. If the last seeds falls in a non empty pit of the inner row, and there are any seeds in the opponent's player's pits in the same column, those seeds are captured. The capturing player will then sow these captured seeds starting from the pit where the capturing seed was dropped. If the last seed is dropped in a non empty pit but a capture is not possible, then relay-sowing applies.

The first player that cannot move (as her pits are empty or only hold one seed each) loses the game.

=== Rules for boys ===
The rules for boys are much like those for women. Game setup is different, with 17 seeds in the corner pits:

Another difference is that there is an "overture" phase whereby players will only use the pits from the 7 lefthand columns (i.e., they will not be able to sow from or through their rightmost pits), just as if the board was 2x7 instead of 2x8. Also, seeds from the rightmost column of each player cannot be captured. The overture phase ends when the player chooses to sow from his ng'hana (the pit holding 17 seeds). Note that each player may decide when to end his overture independent of his opponent.

== See also ==
- Kisolo
