= Jean-Claude Ganga =

Congolese sports administrator (1934–2020)

- Born: 28 February 1934; Brazzaville, French West Africa
- Died: 28 March 2020 (aged 86); Mansimou, Republic of Congo
- Occupation: Sports Administrator

Jean-Claude Ganga (28 February 1934 – 28 March 2020) was a Congolese sports administrator.

== Biography ==
Ganga discovered his passion for football during his youth while playing in the streets of Bacongo. After his studies, Ganga became a teacher. However, he had a preference for sporting activities. He directed youth sports at his school from 1967 to 1968, and then became secretary general of the Higher Sports Council in Africa, of which he was a co-founder.

Ganga helped the CSSA to organize the boycott of African countries at the 1976 Summer Olympics in Montreal to protest against the Apartheid in South Africa. However, he left the CSSA the following year on account of "abuse of power" and "fanciful management".

He served on the International Olympic Committee (IOC) and served as chair of the Association of National Olympic Committees of Africa (ANOCA).

In 1995, a few months before the 2002 Winter Olympics were designated for Salt Lake City, Ganga purchased three villas south of the future downhill slopes. After the IOC's decision for the Olympics to take place in Salt Lake City, Ganga sold the villas, making a profit of approximately $60,000. Taking advantage of his stay in Utah, Ganga also received treatment for hepatitis for free. Finally, he was given $40,000 by the chairman of the IOC's bid committee to "develop sports for the youth of the Republic of Congo".

On 17 March 1999, at an IOC meeting at the Château de Beaulieu in Lausanne, Ganga defended himself "tooth and nail before his peers". However, he was removed from the International Olympic Committee on account of corruption. After his exclusion from the IOC, Ganga threatened to "unpack everything", but never did.

Ganga's niece is Lasnet Nkouka, 1988 Olympic 400 metres runner for the Republic of the Congo.

== Publications ==
- Combats pour un sport africain (2000)
