= Kiela =

Traditional Angolan game

Kiela is a traditional mancala (board game) played by the Kimbundu people in northern Angola, who describe it as "a game of peace". A national tournament of Kiela is held every year in Angola since 1999. The game is similar to the ugandan mancala Omweso and its variants, which are played throughout eastern and southern Africa.

== See also ==
- Omweso
- Kimbundu
- Morabaraba
- Wela

== Bibliography ==
- Bernardo Campos, Kiela: Um jogo de origem africana, Livraria Bertrand, Lisbon 1998
