= Omweso =

Ugandan traditional mancala game

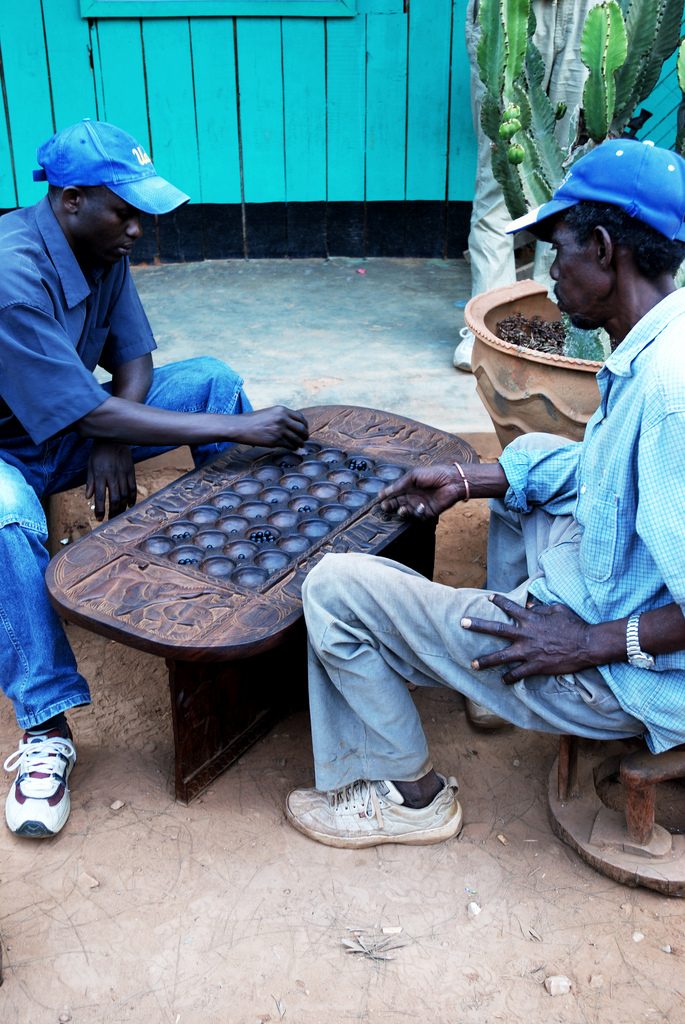
- Omweso (or Igisoro) players in Kigali, Rwanda
- Ranks: Four
- Sowing: Multilap
- Region: Uganda

Omweso (sometimes shortened to Mweso) is the traditional mancala game of the Ugandan people. The game was supposedly introduced by the Bachwezi people of the ancient Bunyoro-kitara empire of Uganda. Nowadays the game is played and enjoyed by people from various parts of Uganda. The equipment needed for the game is essentially the same as that of the Bao game (found in Tanzania and neighbouring countries). Omweso is strictly related to a wide family of mancalas found in eastern and southern Africa; these include Coro in the Lango region of Uganda, Aweet in Sudan, ǁHus in Namibia, Kombe in Lamu (Kenya), Mongale in Mombasa (Kenya), Mongola in Congo, Igisoro in Rwanda, and Kiela in Angola.

The name "Omweso" is derived from Swahili word michezo, which means "game".

Omweso, as the Baganda call it is also known as vulumula in Busoga, ascoro/soro to the Luo, amwesor to the Itesots, coro to the Lango and ekibuguzo to the Rwandese. It is the same game almost similar rules but with different names.

== Rules ==
=== Equipment ===
| 4 | 4 | 4 | 4 | 4 | 4 | 4 | 4 |
| Empty | Empty | Empty | Empty | Empty | Empty | Empty | Empty |
| Empty | Empty | Empty | Empty | Empty | Empty | Empty | Empty |
| 4 | 4 | 4 | 4 | 4 | 4 | 4 | 4 |

Omweso requires a board of 32 pits, arranged with eight pits lengthwise towards the players, and four pits deep. Each player's territory is the 16 pits on their side of the board. In addition, 64 undifferentiated seeds are needed. This equipment is the same used for many variants of Omweso as well as for the Bao game from Zanzibar and Tanzania. Unlike Bao boards, Omweso boards have no special pit (nyumba).

Boards are traditionally carved from wood, and seeds may be natural forexample indigenous seeds or manufactured counters.

Unlike the related Bao games of East Africa, Omweso boards have no special pits or distinguished houses.

=== Object ===
The normal way to win the game is to be the last player to be able to make a legal move, possible by capturing all an opponent's stones or reducing the opponent to no more than one seed in each pit. Alternatively, a player can win by capturing on both ends of the board in one turn.

=== Setup ===
Before the game, four (4) seeds are placed in each of the eight pits closest to a player to ensure that both players have exactly 32 seeds. The first player is chosen by lot. This player arranges all owned seeds on their side of the board according to preference (The arrangement should be strategic). Then, the second player also arranges their seeds. The first player then makes the first sowing move.

=== Sowing ===
Play consists of turns, each move may involve several laps. A player moves by selecting a pit with at least two seeds, and sowing them one by one around their side of the board in a counter-clockwise direction from the starting pit. The player may only sow from one of the sixteen pits in their territory, and the sowing proceeds around this territory, not directly involving the opponent's side.

Although in the past it was common for players to spend much time in thought, in modern tournaments only three seconds of thought is allowed per turn. The referee counts emu, bbiri, and if the turn is not started the other player may steal it.

If the final seed falls into an occupied pit, a relay sowing occurs: those seeds are immediately picked up and sown in the same direction until the final seed lands in an empty pit.

==== Example turn ====
| 5 | Empty | Empty | Empty | 1 | 1 | 1 | 1 |
| Empty | 3 | Empty | 5 | 5 | 5 | Empty | 5 |
| 10 | 4 | 1 | 4 | 4 | Empty | Empty | 4 |
| 1 | Empty | Empty | Empty | 4 (highlighted) | Empty | Empty | Empty |

Preparing to sow from the highlighted hole.

| 5 | Empty | Empty | Empty | 1 | 1 | 1 | 1 (highlighted) |
| Empty | 3 | Empty | 5 | 5 | 5 | Empty | 5 (highlighted) |
| 10 | 4 | 1 | 4 | 4 | Empty | Empty | 5 |
| 1 | Empty | Empty | Empty | Empty | 1 | 1 | 1 |

Sowing captures 6 seeds.

| 5 | Empty | Empty | Empty | 1 | 1 | 1 | Empty |
| Empty | 3 | Empty | 5 | 5 | 5 | Empty | Empty |
| 10 | 4 | 1 | 4 | 4 | 1 | 1 | 6 |
| 1 | Empty | Empty | Empty | Empty (highlighted) | 2 | 2 | 2 |

The 6 captured seeds are resown from the starting hole.

==== Relay sowing ====
If the last sowed seed lands in an occupied pit (without resulting in a capture, see below), then all seeds in that pit, including the one just placed, are immediately sown, before the opponent's turn. This continues until the last sowing ends in an empty pit.

=== Capturing ===
If the last seed sown lands in one of the player's eight inner pits, which is occupied, and furthermore both the opponent's pits in this same column are occupied, then all seeds from these two pits are captured and sown starting from the pit where this capturing lap began (i.e., from the last pit scooped, NOT from the original hole from the very beginning of the turn).

==== Reverse capturing ====
Instead of sowing in a counter-clockwise direction, a player may sow clockwise from any of their four leftmost pits if this results in a capture. Upon re-entering these reverse-captured seeds, the player may sow them clockwise again, if and only if this play results in a direct capture. The player may also choose to sow reverse-captured seeds in the usual counter-clockwise manner, and there is no compulsion to play one direction or the other when the choice is available. During a relay-sowing move, one lap of which ends at one of the four leftmost pits, a player may also change direction and begin sowing the next leg of the move clockwise, if and only if this play results in a direct capture.

=== Alternate victory conditions ===
The normal way to win the game is to be the last player left with a legal move. However, there are two additional victory conditions:

Emitwe-ebiri
During the same move, a player can win by capturing opponent's seeds on both ends of the board.
Akakyala
In some tournaments, a player may win by capturing in each of two separate moves, before the opponent has captured their first seed.

In addition, a special win called akawumbi occurs when a player captures seeds from each of an opponent's pits in one turn. In a tournament, this may be weighted several times a more mundane victory.

=== Never ending moves ===
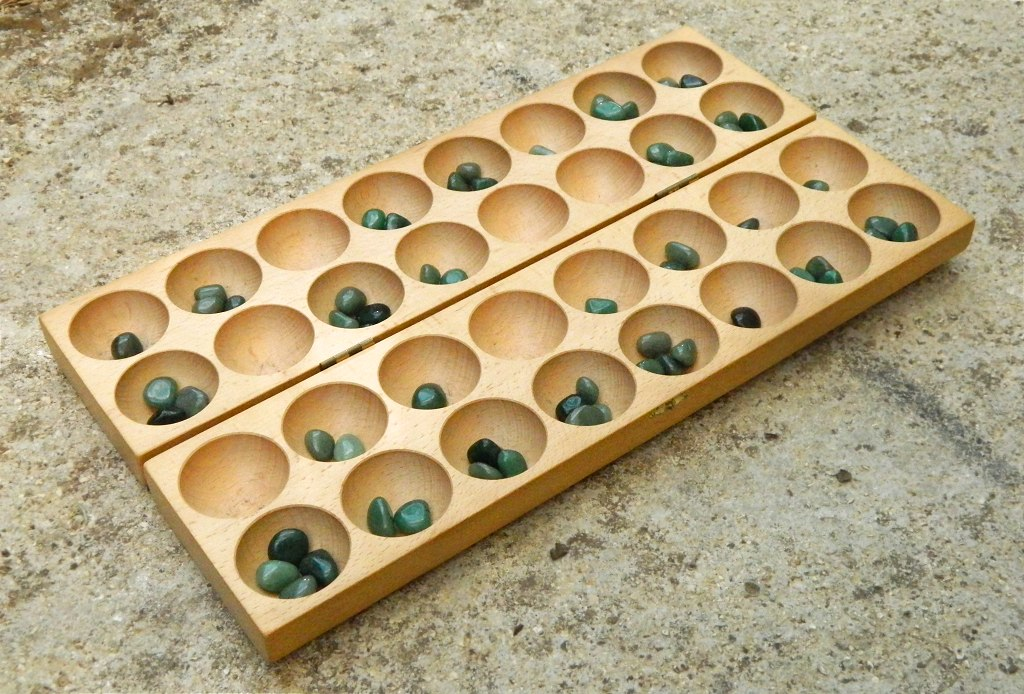
A modern, European board with jaden pieces

It is possible for a move to lead to a never-ending sowing sequence. In tournament play, a player is allowed up to three minutes to finish his move - if this cannot be done, the game is annulled.

== Gender and social aspects ==
Traditionally, some cultural taboos discouraged women from participating in Omweso, with folklore cautioning against girls playing the game.

== See also ==
- List of mancala games
- Igisoro
- Kisolo
- Bao
