= Katro =

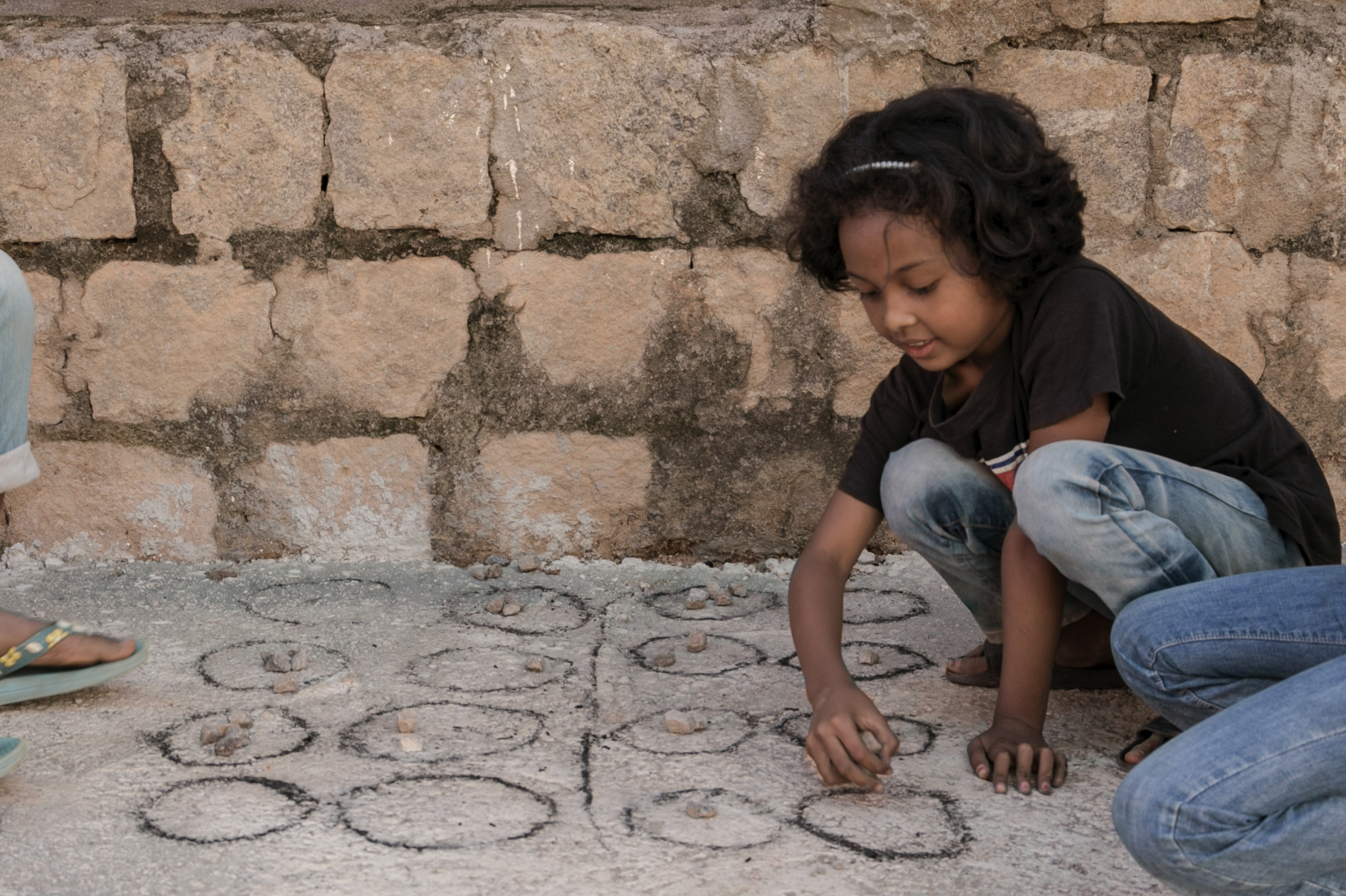
Girl playing katro.

Katro is a traditional mancala game played by the Betsileo people in the Fianarantsoa Province of Madagascar. The game was first described by Alex de Voogt in 1998.

== Rules ==
Katro is played on a 6 × 6 board (6 rows of 6 pits each). Each player controls half of the board (three rows). At game setup, two seeds are placed in each pit.

At his or her turn, the player relay sows the seeds from one of his or her pits, with the constraint that the chosen pit must be in the outermost non-empty row. As with most mancala-IV (i.e., mancalas with 4 rows), sowing is confined to the player's own rows. Sowing may occur in two "directions". Consider the following scheme:

a b c d e f
l k j i h g
m n o p q r
M N O P Q R
L K J I H G
A B C D E F

The southern player can either sow like this:

A B C D E F G H I J K L M N O P Q R A B C....

or like this:

F E D C B A L K J I H G R Q P O N M F E D....

If the last seed of the sowing is dropped in an empty pit, this may cause a capture if the following applies:

- the pit where the seed was dropped is in the innermost non-empty row;
- the opponent has a non-empty pit in his or her innermost non-empty row, in the same column.

If both conditions apply, all the seeds from the opponent's pit are captured, as well as the capturing seed. The player then resumes sowing, using the captured seeds.

The first player to be left without seeds loses the game.

== See also ==
- Fanorona, another malagasy abstract game
