= Bao =

Bao or BAO may refer to:

== Cuisine ==
- Baozi, a type of Chinese dumpling made of a steamed or baked bun with fillings
- Cha siu bao, a pork-filled steamed bun
- Gua bao, steamed clam-shaped bun sandwiched with meat and condiments
- Bánh bao, Vietnamese dumpling with pork meat inside, derived from the Chinese bao
- Bao stir-frying, a stir frying technique

== People ==
- Bao (surname), a common pronunciation for some Chinese surnames, such as 包 and 鮑
  - Bao Zheng or Lord Bao, Chinese judge of Song China
    - Justice Bao (disambiguation)
- Bao (musician), Vietnamese-American musician

== Acronyms ==
- Baccalaureus in Arte Obstetricia, Bachelor of Obstetrics, a medical degree unique to Ireland
- Baryon acoustic oscillations, in physical cosmology
- Batman: Arkham Origins
- Beijing Astronomical Observatory
- Benny Anderssons orkester
  - BAO!, their second studio album
- Bruce Artwick Organization
- Bullets And Octane

== Others ==
- Bao (film), 2018 Pixar short film about an animated bao dumpling
- Bao (game), a board game from East Africa and a variant of the game of mancala
- Barium oxide (BaO)
