= African Youth Games =

International multi-sports competition

- Abbreviation: AYG
- Frequency: Every 4 years
- Inaugurated: 2010
- Most recent: 2025

The African Youth Games is an international multi-sport event held every four years to complement the current Africa Games. The first games was hosted by Rabat, Morocco. The Games have been organized by the Association of National Olympic Committees of Africa. The Games are described as the second-largest continental multi-sport event after the African Games.

== History ==
The competition has been created by Lassana Palenfo, current director of the Association of National Olympic Committees of Africa (ANOCA). The idea came in 2006, but the first African Youth Games only occurred in 2010. The first edition was held in Rabat, Morocco between 13 June and 18 July 2010.

== Editions ==
Host cities of the African Youth Games

Games	Year	Host city	Host country	Start Date	End Date	Nations	Athletes	Sports	Top Country On Medal Table
1	2010	Rabat	Morocco	13 June	18 July	40	1008	16	Tunisia
2	2014	Gaborone	Botswana	22 May	31 May	54	2500	20	Egypt
3	2018	Algiers	Algeria	19 July	28 July	54	3098	35	Egypt
–	2022	Cairo	Egypt	26 August	6 September	Cancelled			
4	2025	Luanda	Angola	10 December	20 December	51	2076	23	South Africa

== See also ==
- African Games
