= Association of National Olympic Committees of Africa =

International organization

Association of National Olympic Committees of Africa Association des Comités Nationaux Olympiques d'Afrique

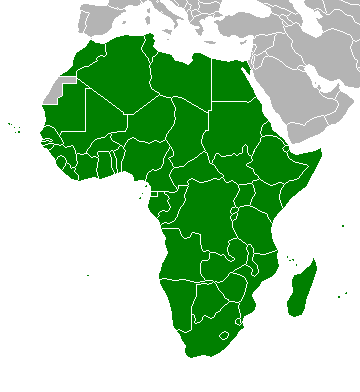
- Countries which are members
- Formation: 28 June 1981; 45 years ago
- Type: Sports federation
- Headquarters: Abuja, Nigeria
- Members: 54 National Olympic Committees
- Official language: English, French
- President: (Algeria) Mustapha Berraf
- Website: ANOCA ACNOA

The Association of National Olympic Committees of Africa (acronym: ANOCA; French: Association des Comités Nationaux Olympiques d'Afrique, ACNOA, Arabic: رابطة اللجان الأولمبية الوطنية في إفريقيا) is an international organization which represents the current 54 National Olympic Committees of Africa. It serves as the successor to Standing Committee of African Sports or Comité permanent du sport africain founded in 1965 in Brazzaville, Republic of Congo.

It is affiliated with the International Olympic Committee and its affiliated bodies, including the Association of National Olympic Committees, and serves as the continental association of Africa.

The organization's flagship event is the quadrennial African Games, held since 1965.

== History ==
The Association of National Olympic Committees of Africa (ANOCA) was founded on June 28, 1981, in Lomé, Togo. In July 1965, ANOCA's predecessor, the Standing Committee of African Sports (SCAS) was founded in Brazzaville as Comité Permanent du Sport Africain (CPSA). Consequently, that title for the sports continental body changed to the Supreme Council for Sports in Africa (SCSA) on 14 December 1966 in Bamako, Mali.

On 4 March 2023, ANOCA announced their support for the International Olympic Committee's decision to reinstate Russian and Belarusian athletes as neutrals amidst the Russo-Ukrainian war, as well as the countries' participation in the Olympics.

== Member countries ==
In the following table, the year in which the NOC was recognized by the International Olympic Committee (IOC) is also given if it is different from the year in which the NOC was created.

Nation	Code	National Olympic Committee	President	Created	ANOCA Member	IOC member	Ref.
North Africa Zone
Algeria	ALG	Algerian Olympic Committee	Abderrahmane Hammad	1963	1965	Yes	
Libya	LBA	Libyan Olympic Committee	Gamal Ezzarrugh	1962	1963	Yes	
Morocco	MAR	Moroccan National Olympic Committee	Faïçal Laraïchi	1959	1959	Yes	
Tunisia	TUN	Tunisian Olympic Committee	Mehrez Boussayene	1957	1965	Yes	
West Africa Zone
Benin	BEN	Benin National Olympic and Sports Committee	Marius Francisco	1962	TBD	Yes	
Burkina Faso	BUR	Burkinabé National Olympic and Sports Committee	Jean-Pascal Kinda	1965/1972	1965	Yes	
Cape Verde	CPV	Comité Olímpico Caboverdeano	Filomena Fortes	1989/1993	TBD	Yes	
Gambia	GAM	The Gambia National Olympic Committee	Beatrice Allen	1972/1976	TBD	Yes	
Ghana	GHA	Ghana Olympic Committee	Ben Nunoo Mensah	1950/1951	1965	Yes	
Guinea	GUI	Guinean National Olympic and Sports Committee	Nabi Camara	1964/1965	TBD	Yes	
Guinea-Bissau	GBS	Comité Olímpico da Guiné-Bissau	Sérgio Mané	1992/1995	TBD	Yes	
Ivory Coast	CIV	Comité National Olympique de Côte d'Ivoire	Lassana Palenfo	1962/1963	1965	Yes	
Liberia	LBR	Liberia National Olympic Committee	Philipbert S. Browne	1954/1955	TBD	Yes	
Mali	MLI	Comité National Olympique et Sportif du Mali	Habib Sissoko	1962/1963	1965	Yes	
Mauritania	MTN	Comité National Olympique et Sportif Mauritanien	Abderrahmane Ethmane	1962/1979	TBD	Yes	
Niger	NIG	Nigerien Olympic and National Sports Committee	Issaka Ide	1964	1965	Yes	
Nigeria	NGR	Nigeria Olympic Committee	Habu Gumel	1950/1951	1965	Yes	
Senegal	SEN	Comité National Olympique et Sportif Sénégalais	Mamadou D. Ndiaye	1961/1963	1965	Yes	
Sierra Leone	SLE	National Olympic Committee of Sierra Leone	Patrick Coker	1964	TBD	Yes	
Togo	TOG	Togolese National Olympic Committee	Deladem Akpaki	1963/1965	1965	Yes	
Central Africa Zone
Cameroon	CMR	Cameroon Olympic and Sports Committee	Hamad Kalkaba Malboum	1963	1965	Yes	
Central African Republic	CAF	Comité National Olympique et Sportif Centrafricain	Gilles Gilbert Gresenguet	1964/1965	1965	Yes	
Chad	CHA	Chadian Olympic and Sports Committee	Abakar Djermah Aumi	1963/1964	1965	Yes	
Congo	CGO	Comité National Olympique et Sportif Congolais	Raymond Ibata	1964	1965	Yes	
Democratic Republic of the Congo	COD	Comité Olympique Congolais	Marcel Amos Mbayo Kitenge	1963/1968	1965	Yes	
Equatorial Guinea	GEQ	Comité Olímpico de Guinea Ecuatorial	Manuel Sabino Asumu Cawan	1980/1984	TBD	Yes	
Gabon	GAB	Comité Olympique Gabonais	Léon Louis Folquet	1965/1968	1965	Yes	
São Tomé and Príncipe	STP	Comité Olímpico de São Tomé e Príncipe	João Manuel da Costa Alegre Afonso	1979/1993	TBD	Yes	
East Africa Zone
Burundi	BDI	Burundi National Olympic Committee	Lydia Nsekera	1990/1993	TBD	Yes	
Djibouti	DJI	Djibouti National Olympic and Sports Committee	Aïcha Garad Ali	1983/1984	TBD	Yes	
Egypt	EGY	Egyptian Olympic Committee	Hesham Mohamed Tawfeq Hatab	1910	1965	Yes	
Eritrea	ERI	Eritrean National Olympic Committee	Luul Fisshaye	1996/1999	TBD	Yes	
Ethiopia	ETH	Ethiopian Olympic Committee	Birhane Kidanemariam	1948/1954	1965	Yes	
Kenya	KEN	National Olympic Committee of Kenya	Paul Tergat	1955	1965	Yes	
Rwanda	RWA	Rwanda National Olympic and Sports Committee	Valens Munyabagisha	1984	TBD	Yes	
Seychelles	SEY	Seychelles Olympic and Commonwealth Games Association	Antonio Gopal	1979	TBD	Yes	
Somalia	SOM	Somali Olympic Committee	Abdullahi Ahmed Tarabi	1959/1972	TBD	Yes	
South Sudan	SSD	South Sudan National Olympic Committee	Wilson Deng Kuoirot	2015	2015	Yes	
Sudan	SUD	Sudan Olympic Committee	Hashim Haroun Ahmed	1956/1959	1965	Yes	
Tanzania	TAN	Tanzania Olympic Committee	Gulam Abdulla Rashid	1968	1965	Yes	
Uganda	UGA	Uganda Olympic Committee	Donald Rukare	1950/1956	1965	Yes	
Southern Africa Zone
Angola	ANG	Angolan Olympic Committee	Gustavo Dias Vaz da Conceição	1979/1980	TBD	Yes	
Botswana	BOT	Botswana National Olympic Committee	Botsang Tshenyego	1978/1980	TBD	Yes	
Comoros	COM	Comité Olympique et Sportif des Iles Comores	Madiane Mohamed Issa	1979/1993	TBD	Yes	
Eswatini	SWZ	Eswatini Olympic and Commonwealth Games Association	Peter Shongwe	1971/1972	TBD	Yes	
Lesotho	LES	Lesotho National Olympic Committee	Matlohang Moiloa-Ramoqopo	1971/1972	TBD	Yes	
Madagascar	MAD	Comité Olympique Malgache	Siteny Thierry Randrianasoloniaiko	1963/1964	1965	Yes	
Malawi	MAW	Olympic and Commonwealth Games Association of Malawi	Jappie Mhango	1968	TBD	Yes	
Mauritius	MRI	Mauritius Olympic Committee	Philippe Hao Thyn Voon Ha Shun	1971/1972	TBD	Yes	
Mozambique	MOZ	Comité Olímpico Nacional de Moçambique	Anibal Manave	1979	TBD	Yes	
Namibia	NAM	Namibia National Olympic Committee	Ndeulipula Hamutumwa	1990/1991	TBD	Yes	
South Africa	RSA	South African Sports Confederation and Olympic Committee	Barry Hendricks	1991	TBD	Yes	
Zambia	ZAM	National Olympic Committee of Zambia	Alfred Foloko	1964	1965	Yes	
Zimbabwe	ZIM	Zimbabwe Olympic Committee	Thabani Gonye	1934/1980	TBD	Yes	

=== ANOCA Regional Zones ===
==== ANOCA Zone 1 – North Zone ====
- Algeria
- Libya
- Morocco
- Tunisia

==== ANOCA Zone 2 – West Zone A ====
- Cape Verde
- Gambia
- Guinea
- Guinea-Bissau
- Mali
- Mauritania
- Senegal
- Sierra Leone

==== ANOCA Zone 3 – West Zone B ====
- Benin
- Burkina Faso
- Ghana
- Ivory Coast
- Liberia
- Niger
- Nigeria
- Togo

==== ANOCA Zone 4 – Central Zone ====
- Cameroon
- Central African Republic
- Chad
- Congo
- Democratic Republic of the Congo
- Equatorial Guinea
- Gabon
- Sao Tome and Principe

==== ANOCA Zone 5 – Central-East Zone ====
- Burundi
- Egypt
- Eritrea
- Ethiopia
- Kenya
- Rwanda
- Somalia
- South Sudan
- Sudan
- Tanzania
- Uganda

==== ANOCA Zone 6 – Southern Zone A ====
- Angola
- Botswana
- Eswatini
- Lesotho
- Malawi
- Mozambique
- Namibia
- South Africa
- Zambia
- Zimbabwe

==== ANOCA Zone 7 – Islands ====
- Comoros
- Djibouti
- Madagascar
- Mauritius
- Seychelles

== ANOCA Presidents ==
S. No.	Name	Country	Tenure
1.	Anani Matthia	Togo	1981–1989
2.	Jean-Claude Ganga	Congo	1989–1999
3.	Francis Nyangweso	Uganda	1999–2001
4.	Alpha Ibrahim Diallo	Guinea	2001–2005
5.	Lassana Palenfo	Ivory Coast	2005–2018
6.	Mustapha Berraf	Algeria	2018–present

== ANOCA's programme ==
- Encouraging mediation and conciliation between NOCs and governments
- Building the foundations of an ambitious sports policy
- Providing young athletes with the conditions for success
- Promoting sports initiatives
- Promoting Olympic ideals and values in Africa
- Taking part in the fight against doping, corruption, violence and pandemics
- Working to bring peoples together through sport to build a peaceful Africa

== Events ==
- African Games
- African Youth Games – first held in Rabat, Morocco in 2010 (events also in Casablanca).
- African Beach Games
- ANOCA U-23 Championship/Olympic Qualifying Tournament
- ANOCA Women's Olympic Qualifying Tournament
- African School Games

== See also ==
- Sport in Africa
- African Sports Confederation of Disabled
