= Jorge Silva Somarriva =

Chilean politician

Jorge Silva Somarriva (born 7 March 1873) was a Chilean farmer and politician affiliated with the Liberal Democratic Party. He served as a member of the Chamber of Deputies and as Minister of Finance in the first cabinet of President Emiliano Figueroa.
