= Bernardo Campos =

Chilean footballer (born 1991)

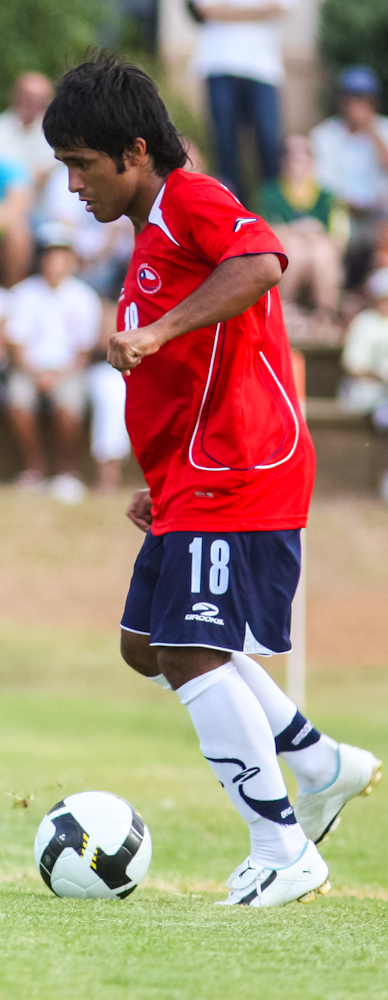

Personal information
- Full name: Bernardo Andrés Campos Araniba
- Date of birth: April 23, 1991 (age 35)
- Place of birth: Santiago, Chile
- Height: 1.70 m (5 ft 7 in)
- Position: Forward

Youth career
- 2007–2010: Universidad Católica

Senior career*
Years	Team	Apps	(Gls)
2010–2014	Universidad Católica	1	(0)
2009	→ S. Morning (loan)	4	(0)
2011	→ Puerto Montt (loan)	24	(1)
2013	→ Temuco (loan)	16	(7)
2013–2014	→ San Antonio Unido (loan)	11	(1)
2015–2016	Deportes Valdivia	18	(2)

International career^{‡}
2010	Chile	1	(0)
- * Club domestic league appearances and goals as of 7 February 2013 ‡ National team caps and goals as of 7 February 2013

Bernardo Andrés Campos Araniba (born 23 April 1991) is a Chilean footballer who plays as striker. His last club was Deportes Valdivia.

== Titles ==
=== Club ===
Universidad Católica

- Primera División de Chile (1): 2010
