= Aïcha Garad Ali =

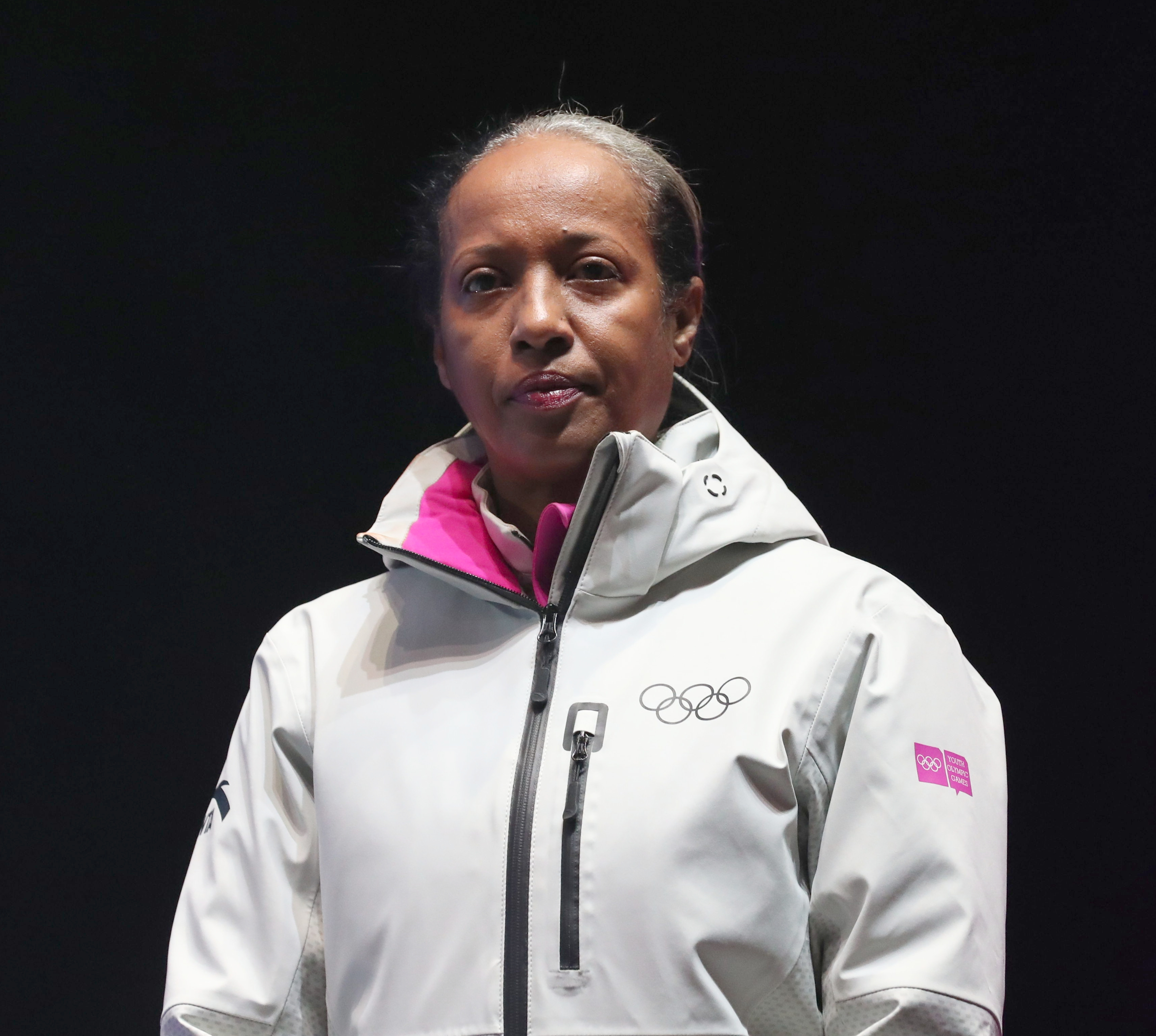
- Aïcha Garad Ali (2020)

President of the Djibouti National Olympic and Sports Committee
- Incumbent
- Assumed office 2005

Vice President of the Djibouti Handball Federation
- In office 1987–1993

Personal details
- Born: 28 December 1966 (age 59)

Aïcha Garad Ali (born 28 December 1966) is a Djiboutian member of the International Olympic Committee since 2012. Garad Ali is the incumbent President of the Djibouti National Olympic and Sports Committee as of 2005 and was the vice president of the Djibouti Handball Federation from 1987 to 1993.

== Early life and education ==
Aïcha Garad Ali was born on 28 December 1966. She was certified as a gym teacher at Abidjan, Ivory Coast in 1987.

== Career ==
Garad Ali started her sports career as a post-secondary gym teacher in 1987. She proceeded to becoming a faculty advisor in 1993 and a sports school director in 1994. Outside of her teaching career, Garad Ali has captained and coached the Djibouti national handball team and became a technical advisor for Djibouti's Ministry of Youth and Sport.

Garad Ali has been a member of several sports organizations and commissions. From 1987 to 1993, she was the vice president for the Djibouti Handball Federation. Subsequently, Garad Ali became the president for the Djibouti National Olympic Committee in 2005 with further reelections in 2013 and 2017.

After her appointment to the International Olympic Committee in 2012, Garad Ali joined several IOC committees including Olympic Education and Women in Sport. Also in 2012, Garad Ali was named a board member of the World Taekwondo Council, and was reelected in 2017.

Apart from her board membership, Garad Ali awarded medals at the 2014 Summer Youth Olympics to the winners of the girls' handball event.
