= Hawalis =

Hawalis is a traditional mancala game played in Oman as well as Zanzibar, where it is known as Bao la Kiarabu, with slightly different rules. It is closely related to African mancalas such as Bao (Tanzania, Malawi, Kenya), Njomba (Mozambique and Malawi), Lela (DR Congo), Mulabalaba (Zambia), Muvalavala (Angola) and Tschuba (South Africa, Mozambique).

== Rules (Oman) ==
Hawalis boards in Oman are composed by 4 rows of 7 holes. At game setup, two seeds are placed in each hole. Each player owns half of the board (2 rows) of the board.

At his or her turn, the player takes all seeds from a hole and relay-sows them counterclockwise. If there are holes with more than one seed, then the player must sow starting from one such hole. If the last seeds fall in a hole of the inner row and the opposite hole in the opponent's half board is not empty, its contents are captured and removed from the game. If both the opposite hole and that behind it in the opponent's half board are non empty, all seeds are captured from both of them. The game ends when one of the players is left without any seed in his rows.

The winner of the game is the player who captures most seeds.

== Rules (Zanzibar) ==
The rules of Bao la Kiarabu were originally transcribed by W. H. Ingrams, who described two variants of the game. One of them is exactly the same as Oman's Hawalis. The other one uses a different board, with 2 rows of 8 holes each (the same board used for Bao). This also differs from Hawalis in that sowing goes clockwise, and that seeds from a hole in the outer row are captured even if the corresponding hole in the inner row is empty.
