= Lassana Palenfo =

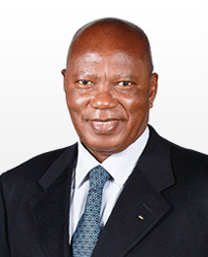

Director of Association of National Olympic Committees of Africa
- Incumbent
- Assumed office 2005

Personal details
- Born: January 25, 1941 (age 85) Abidjan, Ivory Coast, French West Africa

Lassana Palenfo (born January 25, 1941) is an Ivorian military general. He has held various offices in several international sporting organisations. He was the director of the Association of National Olympic Committees of Africa (2005-2018), and a member of the International Olympic Committee (2000–2012), and has been the director of the National Olympic Committee of Ivory Coast since 1999, director of the African Judo Union since 1990 and vice-president of the International Judo Federation since 1990. He was awarded the Olympic Order in Silver in 2012. In his whole life, he practiced multiple sports like swimming, judo (black belt, 4th dan) and football (schools championships). In July 2013, during the elective General Assembly of the Association of National Olympic Committees of Africa, he was reelected for a 3rd mandate in a row as the ANOCA president.

== Biography ==
Born on January 25, 1941, in Ivory Coast, Lassana Palenfo left his country to study in France.

He graduated from several schools in Paris, including the National College of Financial Administration, the Paris Institute of Administration and Management and the Paris School of Social Sciences. Then he followed a military course in the Inter-armes military schools of Coëtquidan and Saint Maixent.

After these studies, Lassana Palenfo started two different careers: a military one and a sportive administration one.

== Military career ==
- Deputy Director of Military Legislative Affairs at the Ministry of Defence (from 1964 to 1967)
- Deputy Director (from 1969 to 1971) and Director (from 1971 to 1977) of Administration
- Director of Financial Affairs and Defence Ministry Programmes (from 1977 to 1982)
- Army inspector (from 1982 to 1983)
- Director of Social Housing and Buildings (from 1983 to 1991)
- Minister for Security (from 1991 to 1993)
- State Minister responsible for security (since 2000)

== Sports administration career ==
- Member of the Ivory coast Judo and Assimilated Disciplines Federation (in 1966) then President (from 1972 to 1991)
- Member of the SOA (judo, boxing and football) (from 1966 to 1983)
- Vice-President (from 1974 to 1978)
- Treasurer (from 1982 to 1990) then President (since 1990) of the African Judo Union
- Vice-President of the International Judo Federation (IJF) (since 1990)
- Vice-President (from 1990 to 1999) then President (since 1999) of the National Olympic Committee of Ivory Coast
- President of the Association of National Olympic Committees of Africa Development and Games Commission (since 2002)
- President of the Association of National Olympic Committees of Africa (since 2005)

== International Olympic Committee cursus ==
- Member of the International Olympic Committee from 2000 to 2012
- Honorary Member of the International Olympic Committee since 2012
- President of the National Olympic Committee of Ivory coast in 1999
- Member of the following Commissions: Women and Sport (since 2002), Olympic Solidarity (since 2006) and International Relations (since 2008)

== Member of other associations ==
- Delegated member of the Red Cross (since 1969)
- Member of the Senegal-Liberia-Central Africa-Romania-Ghana/Germany-Belgium mixed Commission (Istanbul Conference) (between 1970 and 1980)
- Member of the High Commission of State Markets (from 1977 to 1991)
