= Owela =

Traditional mancala game played in several African cultures

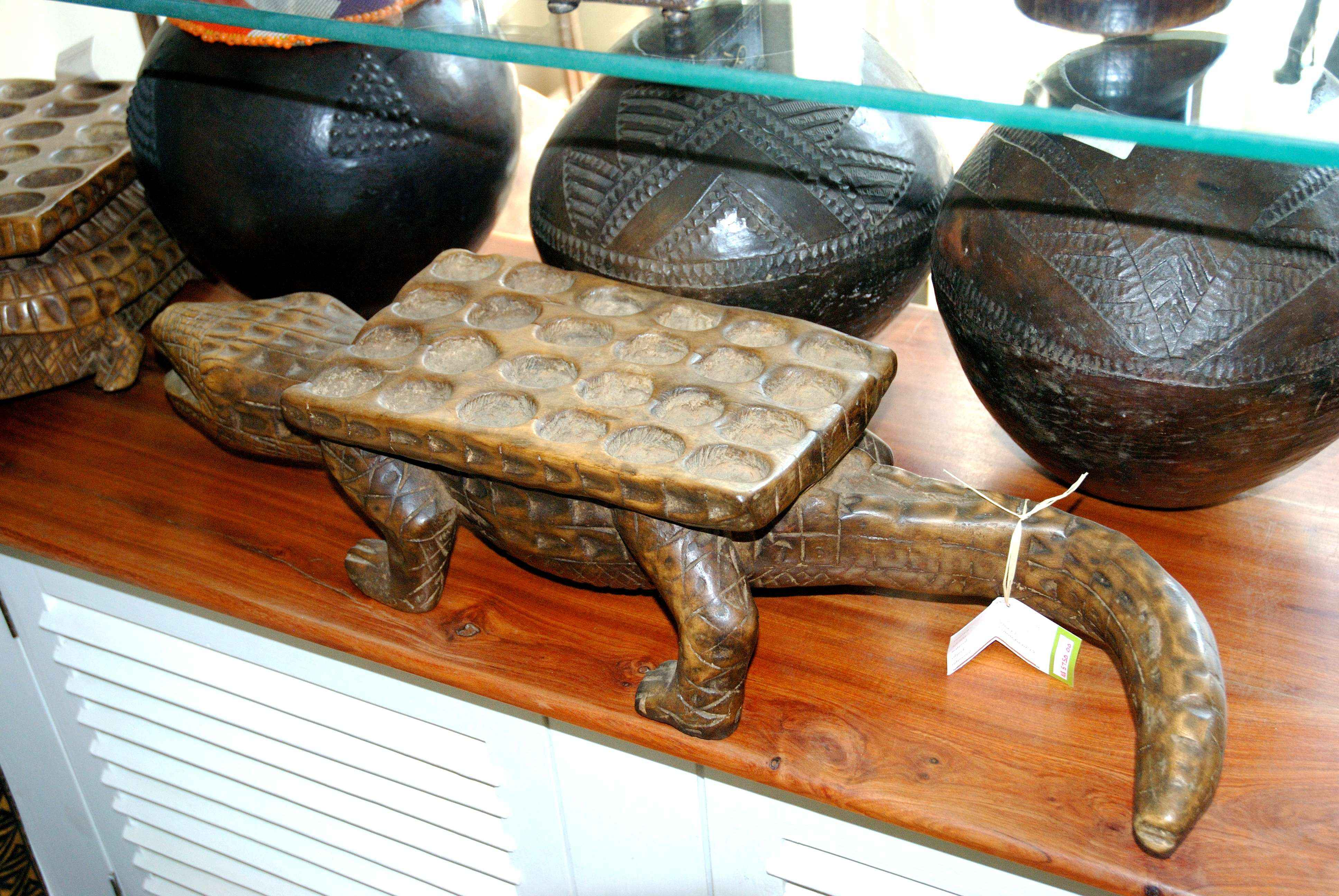
- An owela board for sale in Swakopmund, Namibia
- Ranks: Four
- Sowing: Multilap
- Region: Africa

Owela, also referred to by the Khoekhoe language loanword ǁHus, (Note: Khoekhoe: ǁhüs (ǁHus)) is the Oshiwambo name of a traditional mancala board game played by the Nama people, Herero people, Rukwangali speakers, and other ethnic groups from Namibia (and its Southern African neighbours). It is related to the Omweso family of mancala games played in Eastern and Southern Africa. Although this is an abstract strategy game, the consequences of individual moves are so hard to predict that it can be considered, to some extent, a game of chance.

== Gameplay ==
=== Equipment ===
Owela is typically played on a board with 4 rows of 6 to 24 pits. In addition, a number of undifferentiated seeds are needed depending on the size of the board. Owela can also be played without a board by digging rows of pits in sand.

=== Objective ===
The winner is the last player to be able to make a legal move, possible by capturing all an opponent's stones or reducing the opponent to no more than one seed in each pit.

=== Setup ===
Two seeds are placed in each of the outer pits. Two seeds are also placed in each of the four rightmost inner pits for each player.

2	2	2	2	2	2	2	2
2	2	2	2	Empty	Empty	Empty	Empty
Empty	Empty	Empty	Empty	2	2	2	2
2	2	2	2	2	2	2	2

Starting position for Owela

=== Sowing ===
A player moves by selecting a pit with at least two seeds, and sowing them one by one around their side of the board in a counter-clockwise direction from the starting pit. The player may only sow from one of the sixteen pits in their territory, and the sowing proceeds around this territory, not directly involving the opponent's side.

If the last sowed seed lands in a previously occupied pit, all seeds in that pit, including the one just placed, are immediately sown, before the opponent's turn. This is called Relay sowing and continues until the last sowing ends in an empty pit.

=== Capturing ===
If the last seed sown lands in one of the player's eight inner pits, which is occupied, and furthermore both the opponent's pits in this same column are occupied, then all seeds from these two pits are captured and sown starting from the player's next pit in the sowing.
