= 2025 African School Games =

International youth multi-sport event

- Nations: 50
- Athletes: 1,500
- Events: 21 sports
- Opening: 26 July
- Closing: 5 August
- Opened by: Walid Sadi
- Ceremony venue: 19 May 1956 Stadium, Annaba, Algeria
- Website: Official website

The 2025 African School Games (Arabic: الألعاب الإفريقية المدرسية 2025) marked the first edition of a continental sporting event dedicated to African schoolchildren. They were held in Algeria from 25 July to 5 August 2025, in four cities in the northeast: Annaba, Constantine, Skikda, and Sétif.

22 African countries and nearly 1,000 supervisors are expected for this inaugural edition. Algeria, fully mobilized for the success of the event, is ready to welcome up to 4,000 participants, by providing the necessary human and material resources.

== Venues ==
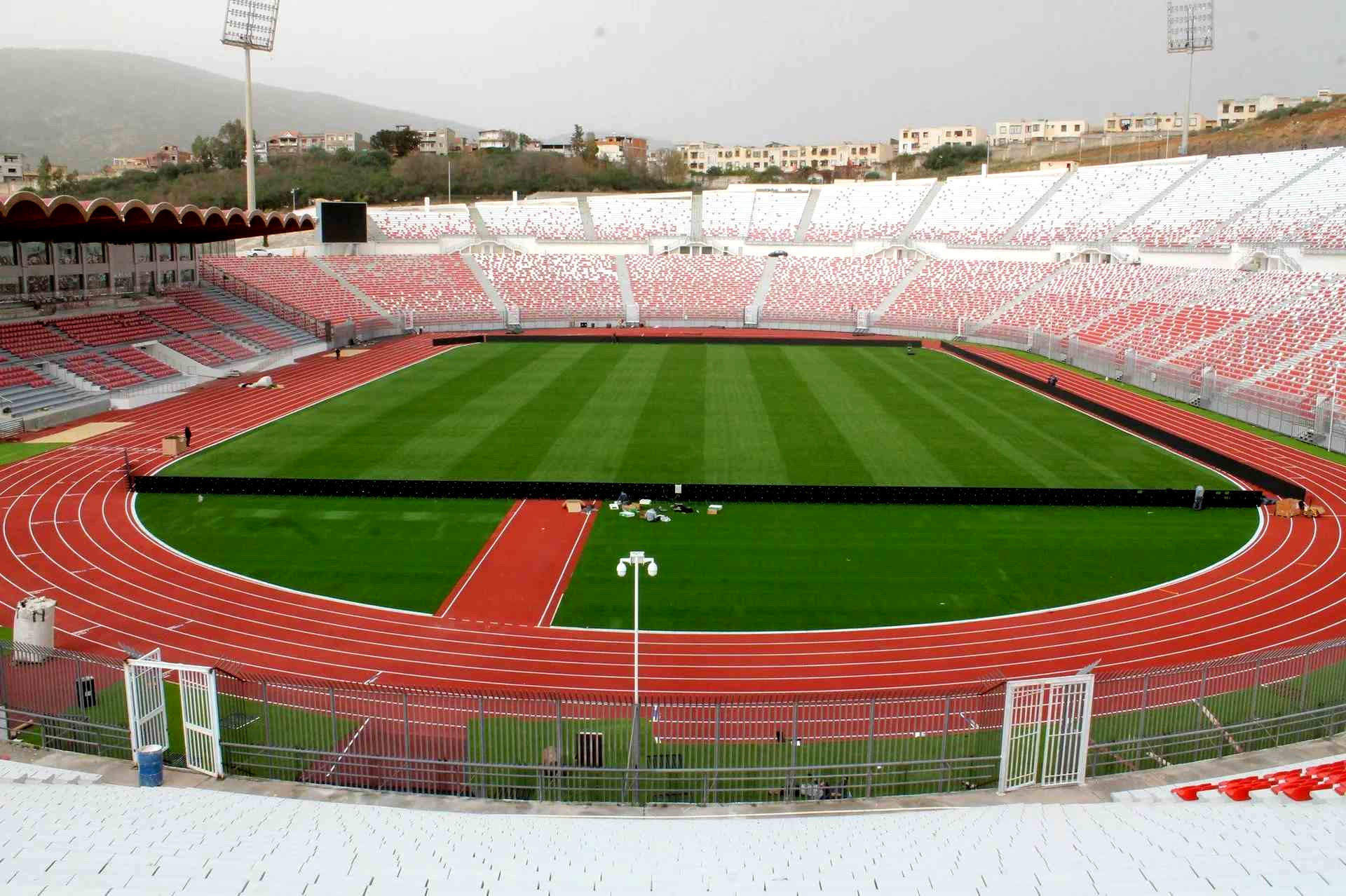
The 19 May 1956 Stadium hosted opening & closing ceremonies

Four cities hosted the games, Annaba, Constantine, Skikda, and Sétif.

City	Venue	Capacity	Events
Annaba (11 events)	19 May 1956 Stadium	56,000	Opening & closing ceremonies
Annaba (11 events)	19 May 1956 Stadium	56,000	Athletics
Annaba (11 events)	19 May 1956 Stadium	56,000	Football
Annaba (11 events)	Abdelkader Chabou Stadium	10,000	Athletics
Annaba (11 events)	Abdelkader Chabou Stadium	10,000	Football
Annaba (11 events)	Amor Rizzi Beach	–	Basketball 3x3
Annaba (11 events)	Draa Errich Arena	500	Boxing
Annaba (11 events)	Rachid Fellah Beach	–	Canoeing
Annaba (11 events)	Rachid Fellah Beach	–	Rowing
Annaba (11 events)	Annaba Road	–	Cycling
Annaba (11 events)	Said Brahimi Arena	1,000	Fencing
Annaba (11 events)	Chahreddine Chahlef Arena	3,000	Judo
Annaba (11 events)	Chahreddine Chahlef Arena	3,000	Wrestling
Annaba (11 events)	Tabacoop Complex		Tennis
Constantine (4 events)	Mohamed Hamlaoui Stadium	22,986	Football
Constantine (4 events)	Ramadane Ben Abdelmalek Stadium	8,000	Football
Constantine (4 events)	Mohamed Belkacem Berchache Arena	700	Gymnastics
Constantine (4 events)	Ali Mendjeli Arena	500	Table tennis
Constantine (4 events)	Ain Abid Horse Riding Club		Equestrian
Skikda (3 events)	Larbi Ben Mhidi Beach	–	Beach volleyball
Skikda (3 events)	Ali Bouchaour Arena (Emdjez Edchich)	200	Handball
Skikda (3 events)	Mohamed Bouchoukh Arena		Handball
Setif (5 events)	Mokhtar Aribi Arena	3,000	Badminton
Setif (5 events)	8 May 1945 Arena	610	Basketball
Setif (5 events)	National School of Olympic Sports Arena	500	Kung Fu Wushu
Setif (5 events)	National School of Olympic Sports Arena	500	Taekwondo
Setif (5 events)	Olympic swimming pool El Bez	900	Swimming

== Participating nations ==
- Algeria (host)
- Angola
- Benin
- Botswana
- Burkina Faso
- Cameroon
- Cape Verde
- Central African Republic
- Chad
- Comoros
- Republic of the Congo
- Ivory Coast
- Djibouti
- Democratic Republic of the Congo
- Egypt
- Equatorial Guinea
- Ethiopia
- Gabon
- The Gambia
- Ghana
- Guinea
- Guinea-Bissau
- Kenya
- Lesotho
- Liberia
- Libya
- Madagascar
- Malawi
- Mali
- Mauritania
- Mauritius
- Mozambique
- Namibia
- Niger
- Nigeria
- Rwanda
- São Tomé and Príncipe
- Senegal
- Seychelles
- Sierra Leone
- South Africa
- South Sudan
- Sudan
- Eswatini
- Tanzania
- Togo
- Tunisia
- Uganda
- Zambia
- Zimbabwe

== Sports ==
Twenty one sports were contested in this edition of African School Games.

- Athletics
- Badminton
- Basketball
  - 3x3 basketball
- Beach volleyball
- Boxing
- Canoeing
- Cycling
- Equestrian
- Fencing
- Football
- Gymnastics
- Handball
- Judo
- Rowing
- Swimming
- Table tennis
- Taekwondo
- Tennis
- Wrestling
- Wushu

== Medal table ==
Source: ASG results

* Host nation (Algeria)

Rank	NOC	Gold	Silver	Bronze	Total
1	Algeria*	103	81	61	245
2	Egypt	59	33	23	115
3	Tunisia	34	69	52	155
4	Nigeria	6	10	9	25
5	Kenya	5	1	5	11
6	Chad	5	1	3	9
7	The Gambia	3	5	4	12
8	Namibia	2	5	15	22
9	Democratic Republic of the Congo	2	4	3	9
10	Ghana	2	3	9	14
11	Ivory Coast	2	1	8	11
12	Benin	1	2	2	5
13	Uganda	1	1	3	5
14	Central African Republic	1	1	0	2
15	Republic of the Congo	1	0	3	4
16	Angola	1	0	1	2
17	Libya	0	2	5	7
18	Madagascar	0	2	1	3
19	Gabon	0	1	8	9
20	Djibouti	0	1	0	1
21	Eswatini	0	0	4	4
22	São Tomé and Príncipe	0	0	3	3
23	Guinea	0	0	2	2
23	South Africa	0	0	2	2
23	Togo	0	0	2	2
23	Zambia	0	0	2	2
27	Comoros	0	0	1	1
27	Lesotho	0	0	1	1
27	Mauritania	0	0	1	1
27	Senegal	0	0	1	1
27	South Sudan	0	0	1	1
27	Zimbabwe	0	0	1	1
Totals (32 entries)		228	223	236	687

== Football ==
Teams of Under 14–17 takes part to the tournament. The football tournament was won by Ivory Coast, beating the host country Algeria in the final on penalties free-kick 5–3 after a draw of 0–0. Uganda took the bronze medal after beating Sudan 3–1 in the third place match.

Event	Gold	Silver	Bronze
Football	Ivory Coast	Algeria	Uganda
