= Jorge Nuno Silva =

Portuguese mathematician (born 1956)

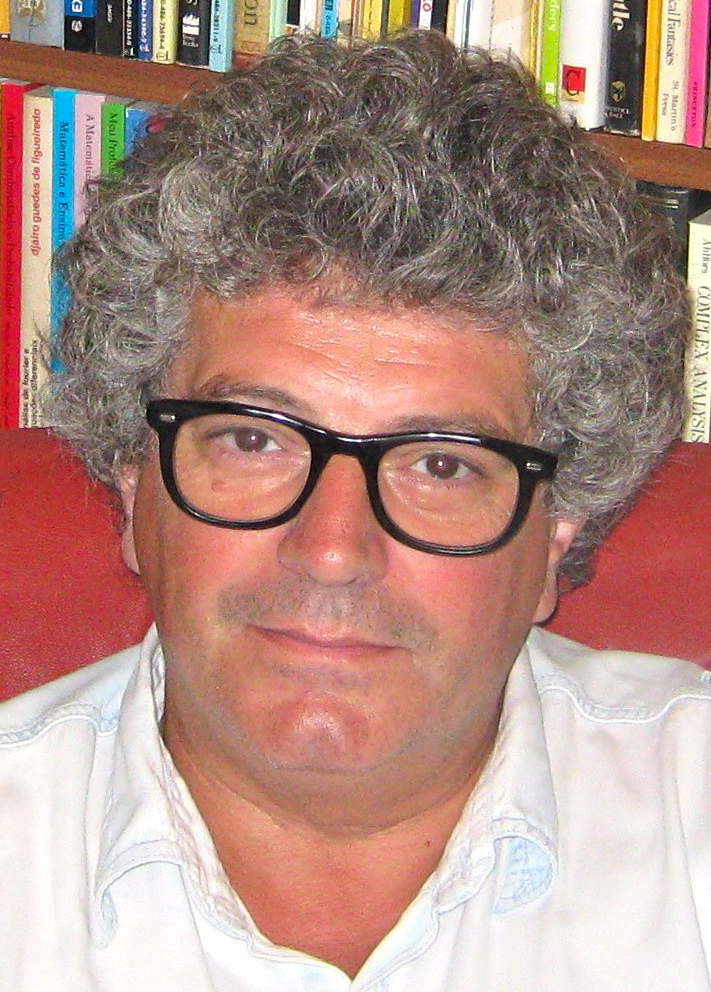
Jorge Nuno Silva

Jorge Nuno Silva (born 1956) is a Portuguese mathematician who taught at the University of Lisbon, starting in 1995 and retiring in 2023. His interests encompass the pedagogy of mathematics, history of mathematics, history of board games, mathematical games, and recreational mathematics. He is the chief editor for Recreational Mathematics Magazine and Board Game Studies Journal.

== Education ==
In 1974, Silva completed his secondary education at the National Lyceum of Viana do Castelo. Subsequently, in 1976/77, he enrolled at the University of Lisbon School of Medicine. In 1983, he earned his Bachelor of Science degree in Pure Mathematics from the University of Lisbon Faculty of Sciences (FCUL). In 1991 he obtained a Master of Arts degree at UC Berkeley, writing Some Notes on Game Bounds under the direction of Elwyn Berlekamp. In 1994 he got a Ph.D. at the University of California, Berkeley with the dissertation, "Some Notes on the Theory of Hilbert Spaces of Analytic Functions on the Unit Disc" under doctoral advisor Donald Erik Sarason.

== Teaching ==
From 1995 until his retirement in April 2023 he was a professor at the University of Lisbon. First at the Department of Mathematics (1995-2006), and then at the Department of History and Philosophy of Science (2006-2023).

He is a teacher trainer for Associação Ludus and the Portuguese Mathematical Society.

== Mathematics promotion ==
In 1998 Silva wrote Berkley Problems of Mathematics, a compendium of problems which is widely used by PhD candidates as a reference. He is president of the Ludus Association (Associação Ludus), an organization for popularizing the culture and history of mathematics. He is a member of Centro Interuniversitário de História das Ciências e da Tecnologia (CIUHCT)

Silva has been involved in efforts to popularize mathematics around the world. In a 2009 interview he stated his guiding philosophy: "Mathematics is, by its very nature, the pure joy of thinking, and the same goes for board games. There is a lack of challenging activities in our Western culture. Games can close this gap; there are many interrelationships between mathematics, history, and culture." In an interview with Diário de Notícias he said, "One day a great game will be invented to teach Mathematics and the world will change."

Silva is the co-founder of the Circo Matemático which, since its founding in 2011, has toured more than a dozen countries on four continents promoting the popularization of mathematics.

In Portugal he has had an enormous effect on mathematics in public education and he often appears on Rádio e Televisão de Portugal (RTP) as an expert on games.

== Books ==
- 1998: Berkeley Problems in Mathematics (with Paulo Ney de Souza), Springer (1998), ISBN 0387204296
- 1998: Some Notes on Game Bounds, Dissertation.com (1998), ISBN 1581120214
- 1998: Some Notes on the Theory of Hilbert Spaces of Analytic Functions of the Unit Disc, Dissertation.com (1998), ISBN 1581120230
- 2013: Mathematical Games, Abstract Games (with Joao Neto), Dover Puzzle Books (19201398), ISBN 0486499901
- 2013: O Livro de Jogos de Afonso X, o Sábio, Apenas 2013, ISBN 978-989-618-421-6
- 2017: Proceedings of the Board Game Studies Colloquium (2017), ISBN 1977599338
- 2022: As Loterias Lisbonenses (1834) de Francisco António Marques Giraldes Barba, 2a edição, Ludus 2022, ISBN 979-883-7880902
- 2022: Tratado da Prática de Aritmética (1519) de Gaspar Nicolas. FCG 2022 (with Pedro Freitas), ISBN 978-972-31-1646-5

== Papers ==
- "Konane has infinite nim-dimension" (with Carlos Pereira dos Santos) Integers: Electronic Journal of Combinatorial Number Theory, January 2008
- "On Mathematical Games", The British Journal for the History of Mathematics: Bulletin 26 (2), (2011)
- "Composition Operators on a Local Dirichlet Space", (with D Sarason), J. Ana. Math. 87, 433-450
- Breakfast with John Horton Conway, Newsletter of the European Mathematical Society 57, September 2005, pp. 32–34.
- Mathematical games in Europe around the year 1000, Gerbertus, Vol I, 2010, pp. 205–217
- Martin Gardner (1914-2010), Newsletter of the European Mathematical Society 79, March 2011, pp. 21–23
- Mathematics of Soccer, Recreational Mathematics Magazine 1, 2014 (with Alda Carvalho and Carlos Santos) http://rmm.ludus-opuscula.org/Home/ArticleDetails/92
- A very mathematical card trick, Recreational Mathematics Magazine 2, September 2014, pp. 41–52 (with Carlos Santos and Pedro Duarte)
- Nimbers in Partizan Games, Games of No Chance 4, R.J. Nowakowski (Ed.), MSRI Publications Series, Vol 63, 215–223, 2015 (with Carlos Santos)
- Allégorie de la Géométrie. A Mathematical Interpretation, Recreational Mathematics Magazine. Volume 3, Issue 5, Pages 33–45, ISSN (Online) 2182-1976, DOI: 10.1515/rmm-2016-0003, April 2016 (with Alda Carvalho and Carlos Pereira dos Santos)
- Measuring Drama in Goose-like Games, Board Game Studies Journal. Volume 10, Issue 1, Pages 101–119, ISSN (Online) 2183-3311, DOI: 10.1515/bgs-2016-0005, September 2016 (with João Pedro Neto)
- The geometer dog who did not know calculus, in The College Mathematics Journal, Vol. 48(5), November 2017 (with Alda Carvalho and Carlos Pereira dos Santos)
- Measuring Drama in Snakes & Ladders, in Game & Puzzle Design, vol. 3, no. 2, 2017, pp. 56–63. (with João Pedro Neto)
- Foundations of Digital Archæoludology, 31 May 2019 (with Cameron Browne et al.) http://arxiv.org/abs/1905.13516
- Mathematical Treasure: Gaspar Nicolas’s Tratado da Prática D’arismetyca, Convergence, MAA, July 2021
- Playing Symmetries. Portuguese Sidewalks, in Symmetry: Art and Science | 12th SIS-Symmetry Congress [Special Issue]. Viana, V., Nagy, D., Xavier, J., Neiva, A., Ginoulhiac, M., Mateus, L. & Varela, P. (Eds.). Symmetry: Art and Science. Porto: International Society for the Interdisciplinary Study of Symmetry, 2022. (with Carvalho, A., Santos, C., Teixeira, T.)
- The Recreational Problems of Tratado de Prática Darysmetica by Gaspar Nicolas, 1519, Research in History and Philosophy of Mathematics (the CSHPM 2021 volume) 2023, pp. 47–56. (with Pedro Freitas)
- The Loterias Lisbonenses of Francisco Giraldes Barba, in British Journal for the History of Mathematics, 2023 DOI: https://doi.org/10.1080/26375451.2023.2258331 (with Pedro Freitas)
