= Bao (game) =

Board game

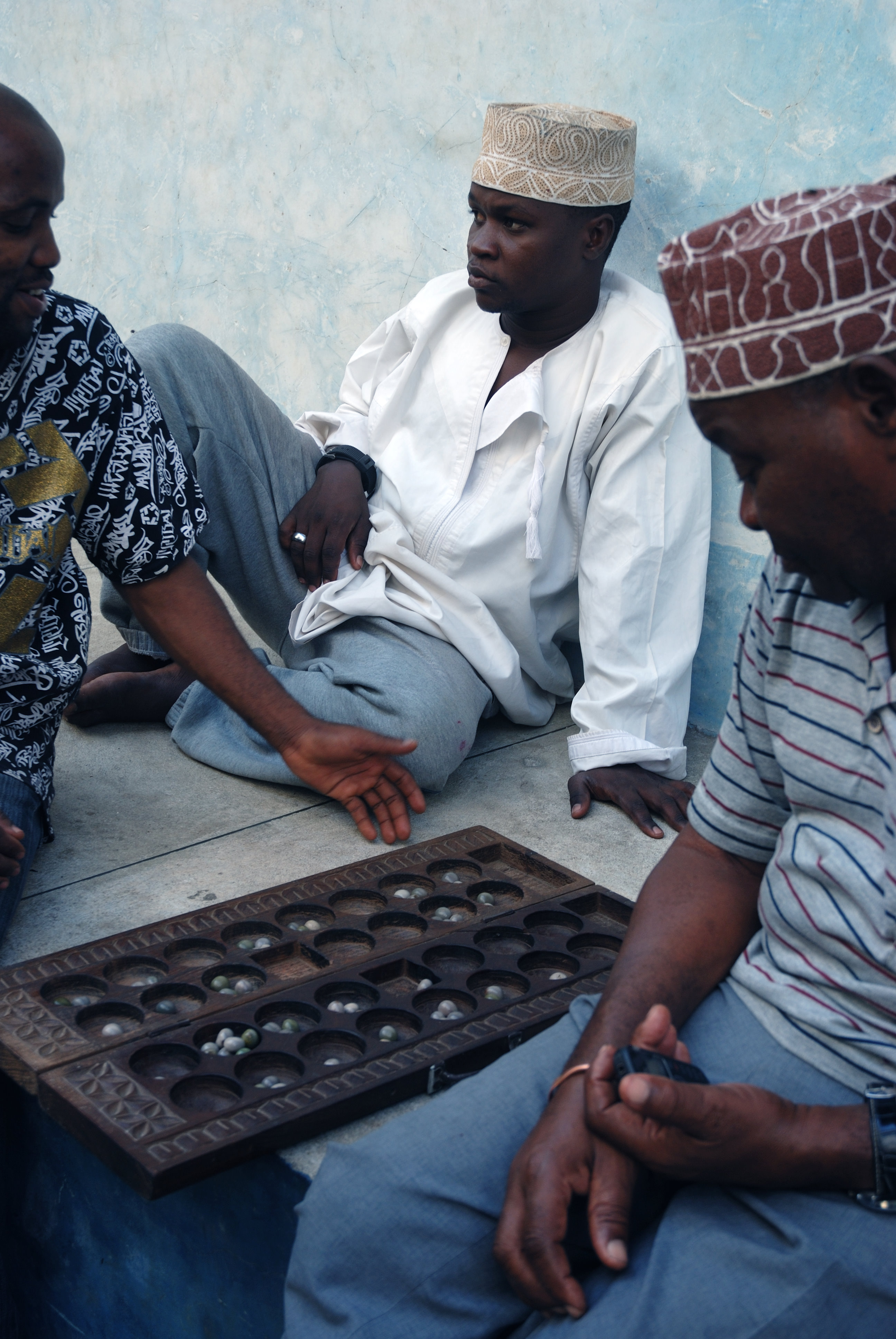
- Bao players in Stone Town, Zanzibar
- Ranks: Four
- Sowing: Multilap
- Region: East Africa

Bao is a traditional mancala board game played in most of East Africa including Burundi, Kenya, Rwanda, Tanzania, Comoros, Malawi, as well as some areas of DR Congo. It is most popular among the Swahili people of Tanzania and Kenya; the name itself "Bao" is the Swahili word for "board" or "board game". In Tanzania, and especially Zanzibar, a "bao master" (called bingwa, "master"; but also fundi, "artist") is held in high respect. In Malawi, a close variant of the game is known as Bawo, which is the Yao equivalent of the Swahili name. In Burundi it is called Ikibugu or Urubuguzo.

Bao is well known to be a prominent mancala in terms of complexity and strategical depth, and it has raised interest in scholars of several disciplines, including game theory, complexity theory, and psychology. Official tournaments are held in Tanzania, Zanzibar, Lamu (Kenya), and Malawi, and both mainland Tanzania and Zanzibar have their Bao societies, such as the Chama cha Bao founded in 1966.

In Zanzibar and Tanzania there are two versions of Bao. The main version, which is also the most complex and most appreciated, is called Bao la kiswahili ("Bao of the Swahili people"). The simplified version is called Bao la kujifunza ("Bao for beginners"). There are a variety of other mancalas across East Africa (and part of the Middle East) that are related to Bao. One of them is the Hawalis game of Oman; it is also known in Zanzibar, where it goes by the name "Bao la kiarabu" ("Bao of the Arabs"). Another major relative of Bao is Omweso (played in Uganda), which uses equipment similar to Bao, and has similar rules.

== History ==
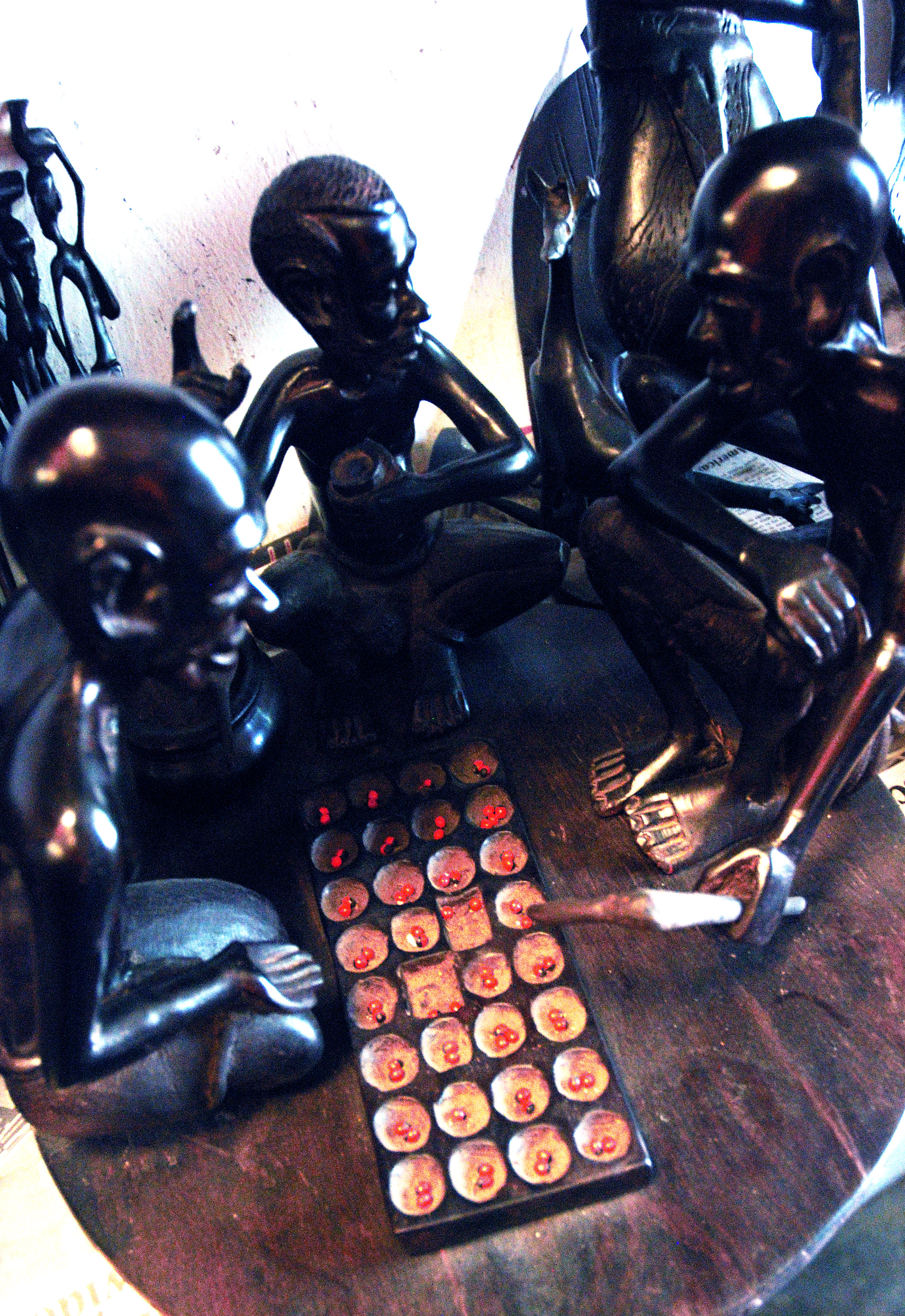
The game of Bao in a Makonde ebony sculpture (Mwenge, Dar es Salaam, Tanzania)

As with most traditional mancalas, precise historical information on the origins and diffusion of Bao is missing. Early accounts and archaeological findings are arguable as there are many games that are similar to Bao in both equipment and rules. For example, a 1658 account by French governor Étienne de Flacourt about a game played by the Sakalava people in northwestern Madagascar is sometimes quoted as the earliest reference to Bao, but scholars are more cautious about identifying Flacourt's game with Bao proper. The study of archaeological findings of boards usually relies on the assumption that boards having a square hole in a certain position (that of the nyumba, see below) are associated to Bao, as it is the only known mancala to have such feature. Nevertheless, as traditional boards are made of wood, ancient evidence of the game of Bao is unlikely to be found. As of today, the oldest Bao board is supposed to be one from Malawi, exposed at the British Museum, and dating back to no earlier than 1896. One of the first written accounts of Bao as played in the Swahili world is due to British orientalist Thomas Hyde, who saw it played in 1658 in Anjouan (Comoros).

Due to its strong relationship with Swahili culture, and despite the lack of historical evidences, it is reasonable to assume that Bao originally spread from the Swahili coast (i.e., the coast Tanzania and Kenya, and their islands). It is also notable that "Bao la kiswahili" means "swahili board game" as opposed to, for example, "Bao la kiarabu" (the related "arab board game", also known as Hawalis). In the 1820s, Swahili poet Muyaka bin Haji from Mombasa celebrated the game in his poem Bao Naligwa.

== Rules ==
As with most traditional games, the rules of Bao were only preserved by oral tradition, and as a consequence, they are subject to local variations. The most influential transcription of the rules is due to board game scholar Alex de Voogt, who wrote it between 1991 and 1995 based on the teachings of Zanzibari Bao masters.

=== Equipment ===
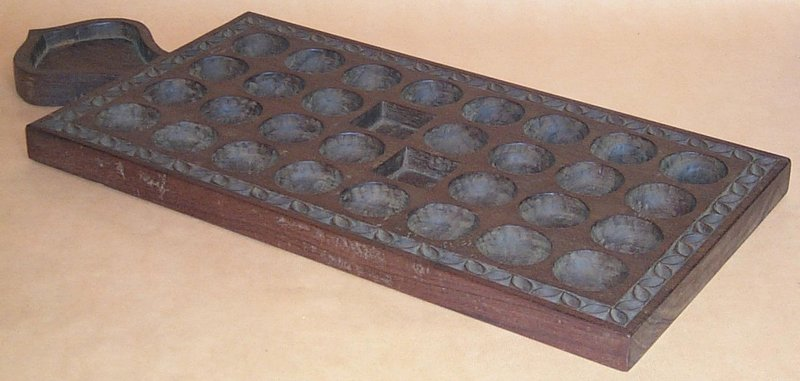
Traditional bao board from Zanzibar. As in most traditional boards, regular pits (mashimo) are round, while houses (nyumba) are square

Bao comprises four rows of eight pits each—in Swahili, pits are termed mashimo (singular: shimo), meaning "holes". Each player owns a half of the board comprising two adjacent rows.

Some pits that play a special role in the game have specific names. The fourth rightmost pit in the "inner" row of each half board is called nyumba ("house") or kuu ("main"); in most traditional boards, it is visually distinguished by a square shape. The first and last pit of the inner row are called kichwa ("head"), while the name kimbi applies to both the kichwa and the pits adjacent to them (i.e., the second and next to last pit in the row).

Each player has 32 undifferentiated counters (or "seeds" according to the standard mancala terminology) that are termed kete ("shells"). Note that a similar equipment (a 4x8 board and 64 seeds) is shared by a number of other African mancalas, including Omweso (Uganda) and Isolo (Tanzania).

The initial setup of seeds is one of the elements that distinguish different versions of the game.

=== Setup ===
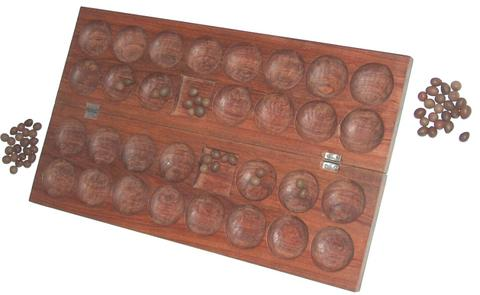
Initial setup in Bao la kiswahili

In Bao la kiswahili, each player initially places 6 seeds in the nyumba, and two seeds in each of the two pits immediately to the right of the nyumba. All the remaining seeds are kept "in hand". In Malawi, 8 seeds are placed in the nyumba. Thus each player has respectively 22 or 20 seeds in hand at the beginning of the game. These seeds are introduced into the game in a first phase of play called the namua phase.

In Bao la kujifunza, all seeds are placed at startup, two per pit. Players thus have no seeds in hand, and thus there is no namua phase.

=== Namua ===
In the namua phase, each player begins his or her move by introducing one of the seeds he or she has in hand into the board. The seed must be placed in a non-empty pit in the player's inner row.

A "marker" pit is a pit of the inner row that faces a non-empty opponent's pit. If the first seed is placed in a marker pit, a capture occurs, and the player's turn will be called a mtaji turn. Otherwise, the turn will be called a takata turn. A player must capture if he or she can do so. In a mtaji turn, other captures may occur as a consequence of sowing (see below); in a takata turn, on the other hand, captures may not occur.

=== Capture and sowing ===
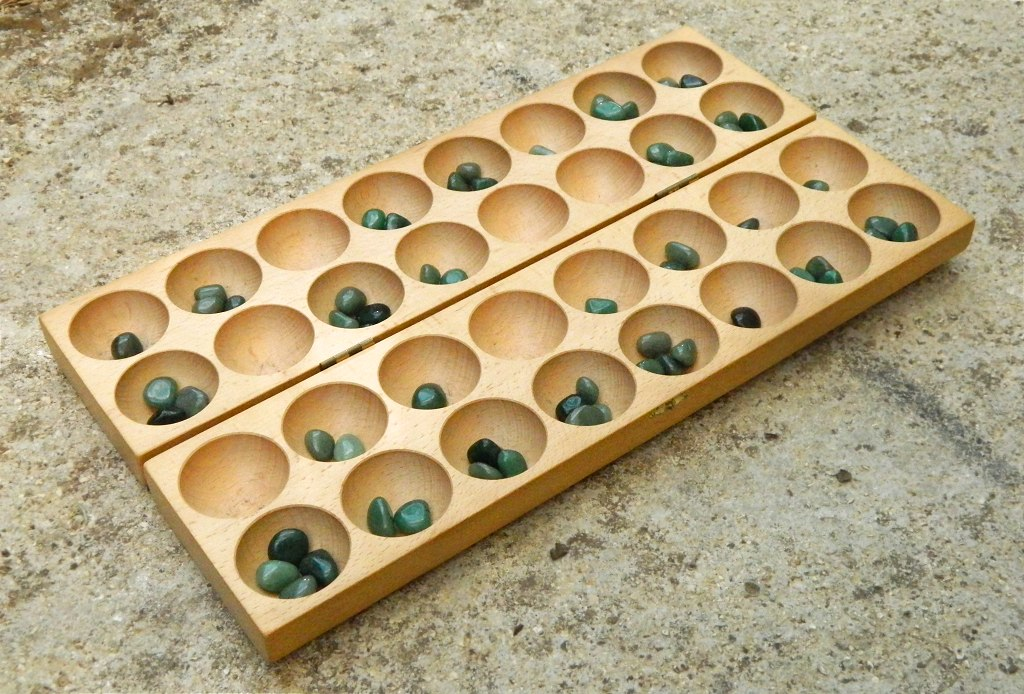
A Bao/Omweso board with jade gemstones

When a capture occurs, the player takes all of the seeds from the opponent's captured pit, and relay sows them in his or her rows. The first seed must be sown in a kichwa; if it is sown in the right kichwa, sowing will proceed counterclockwise, while if it is sown in the left kichwa, sowing will be clockwise. For this reason, the right kichwa is also called "counterclockwise kichwa" and the left one "clockwise kichwa".

The choice of the kichwa to sow from is initially left to the player, with a few exceptions. If capture has occurred in any kimbi, sowing must start from the closest kichwa.

While the player is relay-sowing, if the last seed in any individual sowing is placed in a marker, a new capture occurs. Sowing of the captured seeds will start again from a kichwa. In this case, it is never up to the player to choose which kichwa to sow from, that is: if the capture occurred in a kimbi, sowing must start from the closest kichwa, as above; otherwise, the player must preserve the current clockwise or counterclockwise direction of sowing. That is, if a capture occurs at the end of a clockwise sowing, the newly captured seeds will have to be sown starting from the clockwise kichwa, and vice versa.

If the turn is not a mtaji turn, relay sowing still occurs, but captures will never take place: marker pits are treated just like any other pits.

In any case, the turn ends when the last seed in a sowing is dropped in an empty pit.

=== Mtaji phase ===
When players are left without seeds in their hands, the namua phase is over, and a new phase of the game begins, which is called the "mtaji" phase. Note that the word "mtaji" is used both to refer to a turn and to a game phase; the two meanings must not be confused. Also note that in Bao la kujifunza, the game begins with the mtaji phase, as there are no seeds in hand.

In the mtaji phase, the player will begin his or her turn taking all the seeds from any pit that has at least 2 seeds, and sows them (either clockwise or counterclockwise). If the last seed of this first sowing is dropped in a marker, a mtaji turn begins, with the same rules described above. Again, if the marker is a kimbi, sowing will be from the closest kichwa; otherwise, the player will have to preserve the clockwise or counterclockwise orientation of the sowing that caused the capture.

As in the namua phase, the player must capture if he or she can do so.

If the first sowing does not lead to a capture, the whole turn is a "takata turn", exactly as in the namua phase. In this case, the player must start sowing from a pit in the inner row, if this is possible.

As a special rule, if the first sowing is from a pit that has more than 15 seeds, this will cause the sowing to wrap all the way around the player's two rows and come back to where it was, and the turn will always be "takata" irrespective of whether the last seed falls in a marker or not.

=== The nyumba ===
In Bao la kiswahili there are some extra rules (not included in Bao la kujifunza) that are related to the nyumba. First, if sowing in a takata turn ends up in the nyumba, the turn is over (there is no "relay-sowing" of the seeds in the nyumba). Second, likewise, if sowing in a mtaji turn ends up in the nyumba, and the nyumba is not a marker, the player may freely choose whether to relay-sow the contents of the nyumba or end his or her turn; choosing to continue the sowing from the nyumba is called "safari." Third, if, during the namua phase, the player begins his turn sowing from the nyumba, he will only sow two seeds from the nyumba rather than its whole content; this is called "taxing" the nyumba.

The nyumba loses its special features the first time its contents are sown (taxation excluded), i.e., the first time the player chooses to relay-sow from the nyumba in a mtaji turn, or if it is captured by the opponent.

There are some variations to these rules. For example, taxing the nyumba is sometimes allowed only if there is no other legal way to begin a player's turn. Also, in some versions of the Bao relay-sowing of the nyumba in a mtaji turn is mandatory rather than optional.

=== End of the game ===
The game ends when a player is left without seeds in his or her inner row, or when he or she cannot move anymore. In both cases, this player loses the game.

== Terminology ==
In Swahili literature on Bao, the following terms are commonly used:

- kete: the seeds.
- kichwa: the first and last pits in a player's inner row.
- kimbi: the first two and last two pits in a player's inner row, i.e., the kichwa pits as well the pits adjacent to them. In some cases, the term "kimbi" is only used for the second and next to last pits in the inner row, i.e., kichwa pits are not included as kimbi pits.
- mtaji: referring to a turn, is a turn that begins with a capture, and that may include further captures. Referring to a phase of the game, is the phase where there are no seeds left in hand. Some sources also use "mtaji" to refer to a group of seeds that, when sown, lead to a capture.
- namua: the initial phase of Bao la kiswahili, when seeds "in hand" are introduced into the game.
- nemo: the seeds in hand
- nyumba: the fourth pit from the right in a player's inner row; usually distinguished by a square pit.
- shimo (plur. mashimo): pit(s).
- takata: refers to a turn that does not begin with a capture and, thus, that may not include any capture.

== See also ==
- Tanzanian draughts
- Mancala
- Omweso
