= Index of combinatorics articles =

== A ==
- Abstract simplicial complex
- Addition chain
  - Scholz conjecture
- Algebraic combinatorics
- Alternating sign matrix
- Almost disjoint sets
- Antichain
- Arrangement of hyperplanes
- Assignment problem
  - Quadratic assignment problem
- Audioactive decay

== B ==
- Barcode
  - Matrix code
  - QR Code
  - Universal Product Code
- Bell polynomials
- Bertrand's ballot theorem
- Binary matrix
- Binomial theorem
- Block design
  - Balanced incomplete block design(BIBD)
  - Symmetric balanced incomplete block design (SBIBD)
  - Partially balanced incomplete block designs (PBIBDs)
- Block walking
- Boolean satisfiability problem
  - 2-satisfiability
  - 3-satisfiability
- Bracelet (combinatorics)
- Bruck–Chowla–Ryser theorem

== C ==
- Catalan number
- Cellular automaton
- Collatz conjecture
- Combination
- Combinatorial design
- Combinatorial number system
- Combinatorial optimization
- Combinatorial search
- Constraint satisfaction problem
- Conway's Game of Life
- Cycles and fixed points
- Cyclic order
- Cyclic permutation
- Cyclotomic identity

== D ==
- Data integrity
  - Alternating bit protocol
  - Checksum
  - Cyclic redundancy check
    - Luhn formula
  - Error detection
    - Error-detecting code
    - Error-detecting system
  - Message digest
  - Redundancy check
  - Summation check
- De Bruijn sequence
- Deadlock
- Delannoy number
  - Dining philosophers problem
  - Mutual exclusion
  - Rendezvous problem
- Derangement
- Dickson's lemma
- Dinitz theorem
- Discrete optimization
- Dobinski's formula

== E ==
- Eight queens puzzle
- Entropy coding
- Enumeration
  - Algebraic enumeration
  - Combinatorial enumeration
  - Burnside's lemma
- Erdős–Ko–Rado theorem
- Euler number

== F ==
- Faà di Bruno's formula
- Factorial number system
- Family of sets
- Faulhaber's formula
- Fifteen puzzle
- Finite geometry
- Finite intersection property

== G ==
- Game theory
  - Combinatorial game theory
    - Combinatorial game theory (history)
    - Combinatorial game theory (pedagogy)
    - Star (game theory)
    - Zero game, fuzzy game
  - Dots and boxes
  - Impartial game
    - Digital sum
    - Nim
    - Nimber
    - Sprague–Grundy theorem
  - Partizan game
  - Solved board games
  - Col game
  - Sim (pencil game)
  - Sprouts (game)
  - Surreal numbers
  - Transposition table
  - Black path game
  - Sylver coinage
- Generating function
- Golomb coding
- Golomb ruler
- Graeco-Latin square
- Gray code

== H ==
- Hadamard matrices
  - Complex Hadamard matrices
  - Butson-type Hadamard matrices
  - Generalized Hadamard matrices
  - Regular Hadamard matrices
- Hall's marriage theorem
  - Perfect matching
- Hamming distance
- Hash function
  - Hash collision
  - Perfect hash function
- Heilbronn triangle problem
- Helly family
- Hypergeometric function identities
- Hypergeometric series
- Hypergraph

== I ==
- Incidence structure
- Induction puzzles
- Integer partition
  - Ferrers graph

== K ==
- Kakeya needle problem
- Kirkman's schoolgirl problem
- Knapsack problem
- Kruskal–Katona theorem

== L ==
- Lagrange inversion theorem
- Lagrange reversion theorem
- Lah number
- Large number
- Latin square
- Levenshtein distance
- Lexicographical order
- Littlewood–Offord problem
- Lubell–Yamamoto–Meshalkin inequality (known as the LYM inequality)
- Lucas chain

== M ==
- MacMahon's master theorem
- Magic square
- Matroid embedding
- Monge array
- Monomial order
- Moreau's necklace-counting function
- Motzkin number
- Multiplicities of entries in Pascal's triangle
- Multiset
- Munkres' assignment algorithm

== N ==
- Necklace (combinatorics)
- Necklace problem
- Negligible set
  - Almost all
  - Almost everywhere
  - Null set
- Newton's identities

== O ==
- Ordered partition of a set
- Orthogonal design
  - Complex orthogonal design
  - Quaternion orthogonal design

== P ==
- Packing problem
  - Bin packing problem
- Partition of a set
  - Noncrossing partition
- Permanent
- Permutation
  - Enumerations of specific permutation classes
  - Josephus permutation
  - Permutation matrix
  - Permutation pattern
  - Permutation (disambiguation)
  - Shuffling playing cards
- Pochhammer symbol
- Polyforms
  - Polycubes
    - Soma cube
  - Polyiamonds
  - Polyominoes
    - Hexominoes
    - Pentominoes
    - Tetrominoes
  - Polysquare puzzle
- Projective plane
- Property B
- Prüfer sequence

== Q ==
- q-analog
- q-binomial theorem—see Gaussian binomial coefficient
- q-derivative
- q-series
- q-theta function
- q-Vandermonde identity

== R ==
- Rencontres numbers
- Rubik's Cube
  - How to solve the Rubik's Cube
  - Optimal solutions for Rubik's Cube
  - Rubik's Revenge

== S ==
- Schröder number
- Search algorithm
  - Binary search
  - Interpolation search
  - Linear search
  - Local search
  - String searching algorithm
    - Aho–Corasick string matching algorithm
    - Fuzzy string searching
    - grep, agrep, wildcard character
    - Knuth–Morris–Pratt algorithm
- Sequences with zero autocorrelation function
- Series-parallel networks problem
- Set cover problem
- Shuffling puzzle
- Small set (combinatorics)
- Sparse matrix, Sparse array
- Sperner family
- Sperner's lemma
- Stable marriage problem
- Steiner system
- Stirling number
  - Stirling transform
- String algorithm
- Straddling checkerboard
- Subsequence
  - Longest common subsequence problem
    - Optimal-substructure
- Subset sum problem
- Symmetric functions
- Szemerédi's theorem

== T ==
- Thue–Morse sequence
- Tower of Hanoi
- Turán number
- Turing tarpit

== U ==
- Union-closed sets conjecture
- Urn problems (probability)

== V ==
- Vandermonde's identity

== W ==
- Weighing matrices
- Weighted round robin
  - Deficit round robin

== Y ==
- Young tableau
