= Up (game theory) =

Concept in combinatorial game theory

In combinatorial game theory, up, written as $\uparrow$, is the value of the game where Left can only move to a zero game, while Right can only move to a star game. It is greater than zero and less than all positive numbers, hence it is an infinitesimal. $\uparrow$ may be represented by the surreal form
$$\uparrow=\{0\mid* \}.$$
Because $\uparrow>0$, Left always wins a game with value $\uparrow$. Its additive inverse, down, written as $\downarrow$, may be represented as
$$\downarrow=\{*\mid 0\}.$$
Similarly, $\downarrow$ is less than zero and greater than all negative numbers.

$\uparrow$ and $\downarrow$ are equivalent to $+_0$ and $-_0$, tiny-0 and miny-0.

== Value-$\uparrow$ games ==
=== Hackenbush ===
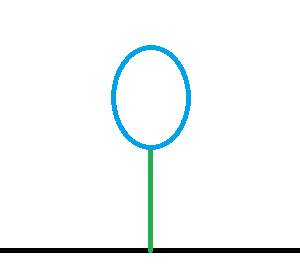
A 1-petaled blue flower, often called a delphinium. It has value $\uparrow+*$.

In Hackenbush, a 1-petaled delphinium, that is, a blue edge on top of a green edge, has value $\{0,*\mid0 \}=\uparrow+*$. Hence, a green edge along with a 1-petaled delphinium has value $\uparrow+*+*=\uparrow$.

=== Col ===
Because a Col position can have only values $z$ or $z+*$ for some number $z$, no Col position can have value $\uparrow$.

=== Toads and Frogs ===
In Toads and Frogs, $\uparrow$ may be represented by the position
$$T\square TFF=\{\square TTFF\mid TFT\square F\}=\{0\mid\{TF\square TF\mid TFTF\square\}\}=\{0\mid\{0\mid0\}\}=\uparrow .$$

== Confusion with nimbers ==
The only nimber confused with $\uparrow$ is $*$. This is easily illustrated by the Hackenbush example, as a blue delphinium and a green edge along with a $*2$ position is not fuzzy.

== See also ==
- Star
- Tiny and miny
