= Winning Ways for Your Mathematical Plays =

Book by Berlekamp, Conway and Guy

- Author: Elwyn R. Berlekamp, John H. Conway, and Richard K. Guy
- Language: English
- Genre: Non-fiction
- Publisher: Academic Press
- Publication date: 1982
- Publication place: United States
- ISBN: 0-12-091150-7

Winning Ways for Your Mathematical Plays (Academic Press, 1982) by Elwyn R. Berlekamp, John H. Conway, and Richard K. Guy is a compendium of information on mathematical games. It was first published in 1982 in two volumes.

The first volume introduces combinatorial game theory and its foundation in the surreal numbers; partizan and impartial games; Sprague–Grundy theory and misère games. The second volume applies the theorems of the first volume to many games, including nim, sprouts, dots and boxes, Sylver coinage, phutball (philosopher's football), fox and geese. A final section on puzzles analyzes the Soma cube, Rubik's Cube, peg solitaire, and Conway's Game of Life.

A republication of the work by A K Peters split the content into four volumes.

== Editions ==
- 1st edition, New York: Academic Press, 2 vols., 1982; vol. 1, hardback: ISBN 0-12-091150-7, paperback: ISBN 0-12-091101-9; vol. 2, hardback: ISBN 0-12-091152-3, paperback: ISBN 0-12-091102-7.
- 2nd edition, Wellesley, Massachusetts: A. K. Peters Ltd., 4 vols., 2001–2004; vol. 1: ISBN 1-56881-130-6; vol. 2: ISBN 1-56881-142-X; vol. 3: ISBN 1-56881-143-8; vol. 4: ISBN 1-56881-144-6.

== Games mentioned in the book ==
This is a partial list of the games mentioned in the book.

Note: Misère games not included

- Hackenbush
  - Blue-Red Hackenbush
  - Blue-Red-Green Hackenbush (Introduced as Hackenbush Hotchpotch in the book)
  - Childish Hackenbush
- Ski-Jumps
- Toads-and-Frogs
- Cutcake
  - Maundy Cake
  - (2nd Unnamed Cutcake variant by Dean Hickerson)
  - Hotcake
  - Coolcakes
    - Baked Alaska
- Eatcake
  - Turn-and-Eatcake
- Col
- Snort
- Nim (Green Hackenbush)
  - Prim
  - Dim
  - Lasker's Nim
- Seating Couples
- Northcott's Game (Poker-Nim)
- The White Knight
- Wyt Queens (Wythoff's Game)
- Kayles
  - Double Kayles
  - Quadruple Kayles
- Dawson's Chess
- Dawson's Kayles
- Treblecross
- Grundy's Game
  - Mrs. Grundy
- Domineering
- No Highway
- De Bono's L-Game
- Snakes-and-Ladders (Adders-and-Ladders)
- Jelly Bean Game
- Dividing Rulers
- Dodgem

== Reviews ==
- Games

== See also ==
- On Numbers and Games by John H. Conway, one of the three coauthors of Winning Ways
