= On Numbers and Games =

1976 mathematics book by John Conway

- First and second editions
- Author: John Horton Conway
- Language: English
- Genre: Mathematics
- Publisher: Academic Press, Inc.
- Publication place: United States
- Media type: Print
- Pages: 238 pp.
- ISBN: 0-12-186350-6

On Numbers and Games is a mathematics book by John Horton Conway first published in 1976. The book is written by a pre-eminent mathematician, and is directed at other mathematicians. The material is, however, developed in a playful and unpretentious manner and many chapters are accessible to non-mathematicians. Martin Gardner discussed the book at length, particularly Conway's construction of surreal numbers, in his Mathematical Games column in Scientific American in September 1976.

The book is roughly divided into two sections: the first half (or Zeroth Part), on numbers, the second half (or First Part), on games. In the Zeroth Part, Conway provides axioms for arithmetic: addition, subtraction, multiplication, division and inequality. This allows an axiomatic construction of numbers and ordinal arithmetic, namely, the integers, reals, the countable infinity, and entire towers of infinite ordinals. The object to which these axioms apply takes the form {L|R}, which can be interpreted as a specialized kind of set; a kind of two-sided set. By insisting that L<R, this two-sided set resembles the Dedekind cut. The resulting construction yields a field, now called the surreal numbers. The ordinals are embedded in this field. The construction is rooted in axiomatic set theory, and is closely related to the Zermelo–Fraenkel axioms. In the original book, Conway simply refers to this field as "the numbers". The term "surreal numbers" is adopted later, at the suggestion of Donald Knuth.

In the First Part, Conway notes that, by dropping the constraint that L<R, the axioms still apply and the construction goes through, but the resulting objects can no longer be interpreted as numbers. They can be interpreted as the class of all two-player games. The axioms for greater than and less than are seen to be a natural ordering on games, corresponding to which of the two players may win. The remainder of the book is devoted to exploring a number of different (non-traditional, mathematically inspired) two-player games, such as nim, hackenbush, and the map-coloring games col and snort. The development includes their scoring, a review of the Sprague–Grundy theorem, and the inter-relationships to numbers, including their relationship to infinitesimals.

The book was first published by Academic Press in 1976, ISBN 0-12-186350-6, and a second edition was released by A K Peters in 2001 (ISBN 1-56881-127-6), containing a new prologue and an epilogue by Conway and several updates in the text. The currently available book by CRC Press, who acquired A K Peters in 2010, is printed in a notably bad quality, see the example at the end of this article.

== Zeroth Part ... On Numbers ==
In the Zeroth Part, Chapter 0, Conway introduces a specialized form of set notation, having the form {L|R}, where L and R are again of this form, built recursively, terminating in {|}, which is to be read as an analog of the empty set. Given this object, axiomatic definitions for addition, subtraction, multiplication, division and inequality may be given. As long as one insists that L<R (with this holding vacuously true when L or R are the empty set), then the resulting class of objects can be interpreted as numbers, the surreal numbers. The {L|R} notation then resembles the Dedekind cut.

The ordinal $\omega$ is built by transfinite induction. As with conventional ordinals, $\omega+1$ can be defined. Thanks to the axiomatic definition of subtraction, $\omega-1$ can also be coherently defined: it is strictly less than $\omega$, and obeys the "obvious" equality $(\omega-1)+1=\omega.$ Yet, it is still larger than any natural number.

The construction enables an entire zoo of peculiar numbers, the surreals, which form a field. Examples include $\omega/2$, $1/\omega$, $\sqrt{\omega}=\omega^{1/2}$, $\omega^{1/\omega}$ and similar.

== First Part ... and Games ==
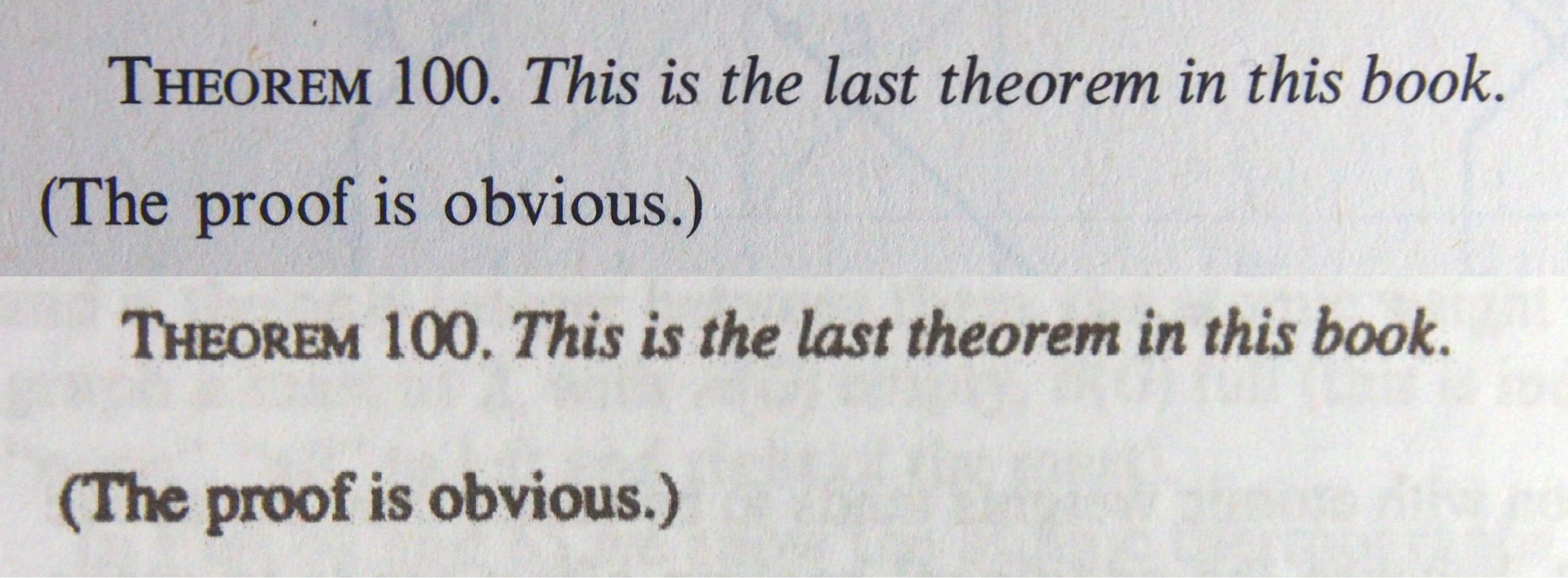
Comparison of the print quality of 1st and 2nd editions of John H. Conway: "On numbers and games". Theorem 100 (the last theorem in the book) is shown.

In the First Part, Conway abandons the constraint that L<R, and then interprets the form {L|R} as a two-player game: a position in a contest between two players, Left and Right. Each player has a set of games called options to choose from in turn. Games are written {L|R} where L is the set of Left's options and R is the set of Right's options. At the start there are no games at all, so the empty set (i.e., the set with no members) is the only set of options we can provide to the players. This defines the game {|}, which is called 0. We consider a player who must play a turn but has no options to have lost the game. Given this game 0 there are now two possible sets of options, the empty set and the set whose only element is zero. The game {0|} is called 1, and the game {|0} is called -1. The game {0|0} is called * (star), and is the first game we find that is not a number.

All numbers are positive, negative, or zero, and we say that a game is positive if Left has a winning strategy, negative if Right has a winning strategy, or zero if the second player has a winning strategy. Games that are not numbers have a fourth possibility: they may be fuzzy, meaning that the first player has a winning strategy. * is a fuzzy game.

== See also ==
- Winning Ways for Your Mathematical Plays
