= First-player and second-player win =

Game where a certain player can force a win with perfect play

Diagram showing optimal strategy for tic-tac-toe. With perfect play, and from any initial move, both players can always force a draw.

In combinatorial game theory, a two-player deterministic perfect information turn-based game is a first-player win if with perfect play the first player to move can always force a win. Similarly, a game is second-player win if with perfect play the second player to move can always force a win. With perfect play, if neither side can force a win, the game is a draw.

Some games with relatively small game trees have been proven to be first- or second-player wins. For example, the game of nim with the classic 3–4–5 starting position is a first-player-win game. However, nim with the 1–3–5–7 starting position is a second-player win. The classic game of Connect Four has been mathematically proven to be first-player win.

With perfect play, checkers has been determined to be a draw; neither player can force a win. Another example of a game which leads to a draw with perfect play is tic-tac-toe, and this includes play from any opening move.

Significant theory has been completed in the effort to solve chess. It has been speculated that there may be first-move advantage which can be detected when the game is played imperfectly (such as with all humans and all current chess engines). However, with perfect play, it remains unsolved as to whether the game is a first-player win (White), a second-player win (Black), or a forced draw.

== See also ==
- Solved game
- Strategy-stealing argument
- Zugzwang
- Determinacy
- Combinatorial game theory
- First-move advantage in chess
