= Dodgem =

Abstract strategy game

Starting position for 3×3 Dodgem

Dodgem is a simple abstract strategy game invented by Colin Vout in 1972 while he was a mathematics student at the University of Cambridge as described in the book Winning Ways. It is played on an n×n board with n-1 cars for each player—two cars each on a 3×3 board is enough for an interesting game, but larger sizes are also possible.

== Play ==
The board is initially set up with n-1 blue cars along the left edge and n-1 red cars along the bottom edge, the bottom left square remaining empty. Turns alternate: player 1 ("Left")'s turn is to move any one of the blue cars one space forwards (right) or sideways (up or down). Player 2 ("Bottom")'s turn is to move any one of the red cars one space forwards (up) or sideways (left or right).

Cars may not move onto occupied spaces. They may leave the board, but only by a forward move. A car which leaves the board is out of the game. There are no captures. A player must always leave their opponent a legal move or else forfeit the game.

The winner is the player who first gets all their pieces off the board, or has all their cars blocked in by their opponent.

== Theory ==
The 3×3 game can be completely analyzed (strongly solved) and is a win for the first player—a table showing who wins from every possible position is given in Winning Ways, and given this information it is easy to read off a winning strategy. For Dodgem on a 3x3 board, there are 1963 reachable positions. Out of the 1963 reachable positions, 1123 of them are winning, 840 of them are losing for the player-to-move, and there are no draws.

David des Jardins showed in 1996 that the 4×4 and 5×5 games never end with perfect play—both players get stuck shuffling their cars from side to side to prevent the other from winning. He conjectures that this is true for all larger boards. In addition, a Python package has been developed for playing and analyzing Dodgem on 3×3, 4×4, and 5×5 boards, providing perfect-opponent play, a command-line interface, a Tkinter GUI, a Python API, and a casual online version.
