= Fuzzy game =

Type of combinatorial game

In combinatorial game theory, a fuzzy game is a game which is incomparable with the zero game: it is not greater than 0, which would be a win for Left; nor less than 0 which would be a win for Right; nor equal to 0 which would be a win for the second player to move. It is therefore a first-player win.

== Classification of games ==
In combinatorial game theory, there are four types of game. If we denote players as Left and Right, and G be a game with some value, we have the following types of game:

1. Left win: G > 0

No matter which player goes first, Left wins.

2. Right win: G < 0

No matter which player goes first, Right wins.

3. Second player win: G = 0

The first player (Left or Right) has no moves, and thus loses.

4. First player win: G ║ 0 (G is fuzzy with 0)

The first player (Left or Right) wins.

Using standard Dedekind-section game notation, {L|R}, where L is the list of undominated moves for Left and R is the list of undominated moves for Right, a fuzzy game is a game where all moves in L are strictly non-negative, and all moves in R are strictly non-positive.

== Examples ==
One example is the fuzzy game * = {0|0}, which is a first-player win, since whoever moves first can move to a second player win, namely the zero game. An example of a fuzzy game would be a normal game of Nim where only one heap remained where that heap includes more than one object.

Another example is the fuzzy game {1|-1}. Left could move to 1, which is a win for Left, while Right could move to -1, which is a win for Right; again this is a first-player win.

In Blue-Red-Green Hackenbush, if there is only a green edge touching the ground, it is a fuzzy game because the first player may take it and win (everything else disappears).

No fuzzy game can be a surreal number.
