= Star (game theory) =

Term in combinatorial game theory

In combinatorial game theory, star, written as ∗ or ∗1, is the value given to the game where both players have only the option of moving to the zero game. Star may also be denoted as the surreal form {0|0}. This game is an unconditional first-player win.

Star, as defined by John Conway in Winning Ways for your Mathematical Plays, is a value, but not a number in the traditional sense. Star is not zero, but neither positive nor negative, and is therefore said to be fuzzy and confused with (a fourth alternative that means neither "less than", "equal to", nor "greater than") 0. It is less than all positive rational numbers, and greater than all negative rationals.

Games other than {0 | 0} may have value ∗. For example, the game $*2 + *3$, where the values are nimbers, has value ∗ despite each player having more options than simply moving to 0.

== Why ∗ ≠ 0 ==
A combinatorial game has a positive and negative player; which player moves first is left ambiguous. The combinatorial game 0, or { | }, leaves no options and is a second-player win. Likewise, a combinatorial game is won (assuming optimal play) by the second player if and only if its value is 0. Therefore, a game of value ∗, which is a first-player win, is neither positive nor negative. However, ∗ is not the only possible value for a first-player win game (see nimbers).

Star does have the property that the sum ∗ + ∗, has value 0, because the first-player's only move is to the game ∗, which the second-player will win.

== Example of a value-∗ game ==
Nim, with one pile and one piece, has value ∗. The first player will remove the piece, and the second player will lose. A single-pile Nim game with one pile of n pieces (also a first-player win) is defined to have value ∗n. The numbers ∗z for integers z form an infinite field of characteristic 2, when addition is defined in the context of combinatorial games and multiplication is given a more complex definition.

== See also ==
- Nimbers
- Surreal numbers
