= Go strategy and tactics =

Techniques for winning in the game of Go

The game of Go has simple rules that can be learned very quickly but, as with chess and similar board games, complex strategies may be employed by experienced players.

== Go opening theory ==
The whole board opening is called fuseki. An important principle to follow in early play is "corner, side, center." In other words, the corners are the easiest places to take territory, because two sides of the board can be used as boundaries. Once the corners are occupied, the next most valuable points are along the sides, aiming to use the edge as a territorial boundary. Capturing territory in the middle, where it must be surrounded on all four sides, is extremely difficult. The same is true for founding a living group: Easiest in the corner, most difficult in the center.

The first moves are usually played on or near the 4-4 star points in the corners, because in those places it is easiest to gain territory or influence. In order to be totally secure alone, a corner stone must be placed on the 3-3 point. However, if a stone is placed at a 4-4 point and the opponent invades, the first player can build a surrounding wall as the second (invader) is forming a live group, thus exerting strong influence on a large area.

After that, standard sequences (Joseki) can be used to develop corner positions, and extensions along the side can be made. Usually, the center area is kept empty the longest. Plays are usually on the third or fourth line—the second makes too little territory, while the fifth is too easily undermined by a play on the third. A play on the fourth line is directed more towards influence to the center, a play on the third line more towards making territory along the side.

== Connection and separation ==
A fundamental Go strategy involves keeping stones connected. Connecting a group with one eye to another one-eyed group makes them live together. Connecting individual stones into a single group results in an increase of liberties; for instance, a single stone played in the center of the board has four liberties, while two adjacent stones in the center of the board form a unit with six; to capture the unit, an opponent would have to play stones on all of its liberties. Thus connected stones are stronger because they share their liberties. While two separate stones have a total of up to eight liberties, they can be captured separately from one another.

Since connecting stones keeps them secure, an important offensive tactic is to prevent the opponent from connecting their stones, while at the same time keeping one's own stones connected. This act of dividing the opponent's stones into separate groups is called cutting.

While one should generally try to keep one's own stones connected, situations exist where doing so would be a wasted move. Stones are considered tactically connected if no move by the opposing player could prevent them from being connected.

In a handicap game, Black starts with two or more handicap stones played before White's first move. If played in the traditional places on the "star points", these stones will be useful for the purpose of connection and separation of stones played closer to the edge ("lower"), as well as in many other ways. Right from the start, the White player's stones are under threat of separation, whereas Black starts with numerous potential connections.

An example of inefficiency or poor coordination of stones in the context of connection is the empty triangle, where the stones are arranged so that they share fewer liberties than if they were deployed in a straight line.

== Life and death ==
A key concept in the tactics of Go, though not part of the rules, is the classification of groups of stones into alive, dead or unsettled.

At the end of the game, groups that cannot avoid being captured during normal play are removed as captures. These stones are dead. Groups can reach this state much earlier during play; a group of stones can quickly run out of options so that further play to save them is fruitless, or even detrimental. Similarly, further play to capture such a group is often of no benefit, except when securing liberties for an adjacent group, since if it remains on the board at the end of the game it is captured anyway. Thus groups can be considered "dead as they stand", or just dead, by both sides during the course of the game.

Groups enclosing an area completely can be harder to kill. Normally, when a play causes an area completely enclosed by the opponent to become filled, the group filling the area is captured since it has no remaining liberties (such a play is called "suicide"). Only if the last play inside the area would kill the enclosing group, thus freeing one or more liberties for the group that filled the space, can the play be considered. This can only be achieved if the liberties on the outside of the enclosing group have been covered first. Thus, enclosing an area of one or more liberties (called an eye) can make the group harder to kill, since the opponent must cover all of its external liberties before covering the final, internal liberty.

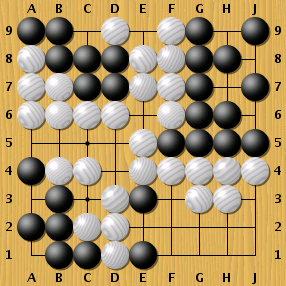
In the top right Black has 4 eyes, making that group alive. In the bottom left, Black is not so lucky. That group only has one eye, with no hope of making a second, meaning that the group cannot avoid being captured. White can play at C3, then A5, then A3, then A1, but this is not necessary; the Black group is dead as it stands.

From this, it is possible to create groups that cannot be killed at all. If a group encloses two or more separate areas (two or more eyes), the opponent cannot simultaneously fill both of them with a single play, and thus can never play on the last liberty of the group. Such a group, or a group that cannot be prevented from forming such an enclosure, is called alive.

Groups which are not definitely alive nor definitely dead are sometimes called unsettled groups. Much of the tactical fighting in Go focuses on making one's own groups live, by ensuring they can make two eyes, and on making the opponent's groups die, by denying them two eyes.

=== Reading ===
Determining ahead of time whether a group is currently alive, dead, or unsettled, requires the ability to extrapolate from the current position and imagine possible plays by both sides, the best responses to those plays, the best responses to those responses, and so on. This is called reading ahead, or just reading, and it is a skill that grows with experience. Many players study books of life and death problems to increase their skill at reading more and more complicated positions. Some of the strongest players of the game can read up to 40 moves ahead even in complicated positions.

One major purpose of reading is to be sure that a local position can be neglected for a while. For instance, a player may be able to make gains by playing for a certain patch of territory. Yet, this play may be worth only a few points, and thus deemed unnecessary, depending on the state of the game. With confidence in one's reading, it becomes much easier to set priorities and switch around the board (see sente). Not changing priorities at the correct time can be a loss of opportunity.

== High and low ==
In order to build a harmonious position, usually in the opening, one does not place all stones on the third line (for territory), nor all stones on the fourth line (for center influence). "Harmonious" as used here is not just an aesthetic quality; rather, it stands for a balance in the overall (strategic) connection of the stones.

== Thickness and lightness ==
An outward-facing position that cannot be attacked, that is, one which can easily get two eyes or connect to a friendly live group and so does not need to answer enemy moves close by, is called thick. Thick positions are important as they radiate influence across the board. An error that is often made by weaker players is to make territory in front of their thick position; this is inefficient because the player is likely to get that territory anyway. Doing so is also inflexible strategically, so invites enemy forcing moves at the border of the incomplete territory. Thickness is better used from a distance, as support for other actions.

For example, if Black has a thick group and a weak group nearby, and White attacks the weak group, Black can have its weak group run towards its thick group. If successful, the strength of the thick group will protect the weak group. Or, if White tries to invade near a thick group, Black can try to push White towards its thick group. If Black is successful, the strength of the thick group may help destroy the invasion. Even if the invaders are not killed, the pressure exerted by the thick position can allow Black to profit from the attack, for example gaining territory or thickness in a neighbouring area whilst chasing the weak stones. A thick group can also support invasion of enemy spheres of influence.

A light group is also one that is hard to attack, but for a different reason. If a group has a large number of options, often including the sacrifice of part of it, it is called light. Because it is usually impossible to take away all or almost all options, attacking such a group is very hard for the opponent and brings little advantage. A weak group which is too important to sacrifice is called heavy.

== Attack and defense ==
A large part of the middle game of a game of Go may be spent by one player attacking the other player's weak group(s). What is important to remember is that in most cases the goal of an attack is not to kill the attacked group, but to gain territory or influence. The attack is more or less used to restrict the opponent's options and make it impossible for them to make territory or influence.

== Ko fighting ==
Suppose that Black begins a ko by taking a stone of White's. White cannot immediately recapture; the rules state that white must, for the moment, play elsewhere. White may believe that good strategy requires they eventually recapture, but Black, on their next turn, will have the option of ending the ko, for example by filling in the spot White would use to recapture. To prevent Black from doing this, White can play a ko threat.

A ko threat is a move that forces one's opponent to respond, or risk a punishing blow. A ko threat by White will force Black to choose between responding to the threat, and allowing White to recapture (thereby continuing the ko), or ending the ko, but having a damaged, poor position elsewhere on the board.

A good ko threat should threaten more damage to one's opponent's position than the value of losing the ko. If the ko is then lost, the trade was still beneficial.

== Sente and gote ==
The concepts of sente and gote are important in higher level Go strategy.

A player whose moves compel the opponent to respond in a local position is said to have sente (先手), meaning the player has the initiative; the opponent is said to have gote (後手). Sente means 'preceding move' (lit: 'before hand'), whereas gote means 'succeeding move' (lit: after hand').

One player attacks in sente; the other defends in gote. In most games, the player who is able to maintain sente controls the flow of the game and therefore has a significant advantage. A player usually accepts gote in order to defend a weak position or to achieve a local advantage such as securing territory.

In the endgame (yose) players typically try to play all available sente moves and then play the largest gote move on the board. A reverse sente play is a gote play that prevents the opponent from making a sente move.

When a player ignores an opponent's sente move and plays elsewhere, they are said to play tenuki. Playing tenuki is as a kind of gambit where the player accepts a potential loss on the local level in order to seize the initiative by playing elsewhere.

== Direction of play ==
The direction of play is a higher level concept in the opening, relating to the efficiency of stones played on the board. This involves the important trade-off between overconcentration (korigatachi) and vagueness - between playing a move that accomplishes too little and a move that tries to accomplish too much. Additionally, the stones already played are taken into consideration. The players aim not only at making efficient new moves, but also at playing moves that heighten the value of their previous moves, and at achieving maximum harmony in a global sense. One must strive to make each stone played important and valuable, that is, utilize its aji, or potential, to the fullest extent possible. Thus, choosing the correct direction of play requires not only a deep understanding of the value of thickness, but also demands a good sense of positional judgment from the players.

== Endgame (yose) ==
The endgame begins when large-scale contention over life and death, invasion, reduction etc. ends. Players then set about maximizing the boundaries of their territories while minimizing the opponent's territory. One must choose which of these moves is more urgent to play based not only on the points it may gain, but on whether that move is sente. Generally, in the endgame, all the major areas are staked out — however, there are still points to be made, as well as possible ways to reduce the opponent's territory. A simple example would be a move that is dame (neutral point), but when filled in, it is sente, requiring white to fill a stone in their territory to answer. It would be thus said this is 'a one-point reduction in sente.'
