= Partisan game =

Combinatorial game with asymmetric players

In combinatorial game theory, a game is partisan (sometimes partizan) if it is not impartial. That is, some moves are available to one player and not to the other, or the payoffs are not symmetric.

Most games are partisan. For example, in chess, only one player can move the white pieces. More strongly, when analyzed using combinatorial game theory, many chess positions have values that cannot be expressed as the value of an impartial game, for instance when one side has a number of extra tempos that can be used to put the other side into zugzwang.

Partisan games are more difficult to analyze than impartial games, as the Sprague–Grundy theorem does not apply. However, the application of combinatorial game theory to partisan games allows the significance of numbers as games to be seen, in a way that is not possible with impartial games.
