= Impartial game =

Concept in game theory

In combinatorial game theory, an impartial game is a game in which the allowable moves depend only on the position and not on which of the two players is currently moving, and where the payoffs are symmetric. In other words, the only difference between player 1 and player 2 is that player 1 goes first. The game is played until a terminal position is reached. A terminal position is one from which no moves are possible. Then one of the players is declared the winner and the other the loser. Furthermore, impartial games are played with perfect information and no chance moves, meaning all information about the game and operations for both players are visible to both players.

Impartial games include Nim, Sprouts, Kayles, Quarto, Cram, Chomp, Subtract a square, Notakto, and poset games. Go and chess are not impartial, as each player can only place or move pieces of their own color. Games such as poker, dice or dominos are not impartial games as they rely on chance.

Impartial games can be analyzed using the Sprague–Grundy theorem, stating that every impartial game under the normal play convention is equivalent to a nimber. The representation of this nimber can change from game to game, but every possible state of any variation of an impartial game board should be able to have some nimber value. For example, several nim heaps in the game nim can be calculated, then summed using nimber addition, to give a nimber value for the game.

A game that is not impartial is called a partisan game, though some partisan games can still be evaluated using nimbers such as Domineering. Domineering would not be classified as an impartial game as players use differently acting pieces, one player with vertical dominoes, one with horizontal ones, thereby breaking the rule that each player must be able to act using the same operations.

== Requirements ==
All impartial games must meet the following conditions:

- Two players must alternate turns until a final state is reached.
- A winner is chosen when one player may no longer change position or make any operation.
- There must be a finite number of operations and positions for both players. For example, in Nim, players must take away a subset of a stack that is currently in play. As there is a finite number of coins in any stack, a player may only remove a finite number of coins.
- All operations must be able to be done by both sides. In all Impartial games, the players are making actions to some game board whether in the form of stacks for Nim or rows and columns Cram. Both players are acting on the board till the board can no longer change in some way.
- No action in the game may be reliant on chance. Any inclusion of chance would mean there is not perfect information about the game, furthermore actions could not be minmaxed ruling out any form inductive strategy.

== Heap game ==
Heap games are a subclass of impartial games that involve the disjunctive sum of various single-heap games. Single-heap positions, or Γ-heaps are games represented naturally by the ordinal amount of a heap of tokens, where players play according to a specific ruleset on that single heap.

Every option of a heap game must be representable as $H^{'}_{n} = H_{a_{1}} + H_{a_{2}} + H_{a_{3}} + ...$, where each $H_{a_{n}}$ is another heap game.

The nim-value of a game is represented as the nim-addition of each heap in a heap game.

Examples include:

- Octal games
- Nim
- Kayles
