= Normal play convention =

Method of determining the winner

A normal play convention in a game is the method of determining the winner that is generally regarded as standard. For example:

- Preventing the other player from being able to move
- Being the first player to achieve a target
- Holding the highest value hand
- Taking the most card tricks

In combinatorial game theory, the normal play convention of an impartial game is that the last player able to move is the winner.

By contrast "misère games" involve upsetting the convention and declaring a winner the individual who would normally be considered the loser.
