= Scarney =

Scarney refers to several abstract strategy games invented by John Scarne starting in the late 1920s, released with names referencing the inventor, including Scarnie, Scar-Nee, Scarney 3000, and Skarney. Although they bear similar names, they may be grouped into three general types, each with distinct rules and gameplay:

1. Board games: Scarnie, Scar-Nee, I.Q. Solitaire, Scarney
2. Dice games: Scarney Dice, Scarney 3000
3. Card games: Skarney, Skarney Kards

Unlike Scarne's contemporaneous game Teeko, in which players compete to build a consecutive or square group of four pieces, the Scarney board games are played by removing pieces from the board.

== Board games ==
=== Scarnie ===
Game board for Scarnie, without pieces.

The earliest board game from Scarne's company, John Scarne Games, is Scarnie (1931), which he mentions in his 1966 autobiography, accompanied by a photograph of himself playing a prototype of the game with James J. Braddock in 1929 at the boxer's training camp.

The game is played by two to four players on a board with 28 positions, divided equally into four "stations" of seven, and uses 28 pieces numbered from 1 to 28; twenty of the pieces are one color, while eight are another color. The players shuffle the pieces face-down, then each draws a piece and shows it to the other(s) face-up, with the player who drew the lowest-numbered piece going first. The pieces are then re-shuffled and placed in the four "stations" on the board, face-up.

In a single turn, each player removes one, two, or three pieces from one station by pushing them out of that station into the middle of the board, subject to the following rules:

1. All pieces removed in a single turn must be the same color.
2. All pieces removed in a single turn must be from the same station.
3. Each player is free to choose any of the four stations for removal during each of their turns, i.e., a player is not obligated to remove pieces from the same station in successive turns.
4. The numbers on the board (1 through 7) are strictly for convenience in asking the other player(s) to help remove pieces without having to reach across the board.

Turns are passed to the left. The objective is to force one player to remove the last piece, which is similar to Nim, but using four piles and 28 pieces; Scarnie adds a scoring system where the winning player(s) are awarded points equal to the number on the last piece removed.

=== Scar-Nee, I.Q. Solitaire, Scarney ===
Board for Scar-Nee / I.Q. Solitaire (1956) and Scarney (1962)

Scarne refined the game and released it as Scar-Nee (1956), which uses a 16-space game board arranged in a square grid and adds jumping mechanics similar to Checkers for removing pieces. Rules were included for a one-player version, I.Q. Solitaire. The game was re-released as Scarney in 1962, and later reissued in 1968 and the 1970s.

Scarney is played with sixteen distinct pieces, four each in four different colors (red, black, yellow, and green), with one side marked with one to four pips. The game board has sixteen spaces arranged in a 4×4 square grid, and each space is connected to its neighbors vertically and horizontally by straight lines. For game notation, spaces are numbered left-to-right and top-to-bottom sequentially, starting with C1 in the upper left corner, continuing with C5 in the leftmost space of the second row from the top, and ending with C16 in the lower right corner; pieces are identified an alphanumeric code using the first letter of the color and the pip value, e.g., B3 is the black three-pip piece.

==== Scarney Solitaire ====
For the solitaire game, the player shuffles the 16 pieces face-down and places one on each square space of the board, then turns each one face-up. The initial move is to remove one piece with a 1- or 2-pip value, which opens up one space.

Additional pieces are removed by jumping horizontally or vertically into an open space, but not diagonally. In addition, a piece may not jump over a like-colored piece, i.e., the piece that jumps must be a different color than the piece it jumps over. For example, a black 1-pip piece cannot jump a black 3-pip piece, even if the targeted space beyond the piece to be jumped is open. The game ends when there are no more legal jumps to be made.

Scoring is based on the pips on the pieces captured, added to various bonuses for a single remaining piece, the color of the remaining piece(s), and the placement of the remaining piece(s).

Scarney Solitaire sample game
Step	Board				Jumps	Removed	Notes
1	G4		G2	R3	—N/a	—N/a	Arbitrary starting position, with 12 pawns remaining.
1	B1		R4	G3	—N/a	—N/a	Arbitrary starting position, with 12 pawns remaining.
1			R2	Y3	—N/a	—N/a	Arbitrary starting position, with 12 pawns remaining.
1	Y2	B4	Y4	G1	—N/a	—N/a	Arbitrary starting position, with 12 pawns remaining.
2	G4		G2	R3	Y3	R2	Y3 jumps horizontally from C12 to C10 over R2 in C11, removing it from the board.
2	B1		R4	G3	Y3	R2	Y3 jumps horizontally from C12 to C10 over R2 in C11, removing it from the board.
2		Y3			Y3	R2	Y3 jumps horizontally from C12 to C10 over R2 in C11, removing it from the board.
2	Y2	B4	Y4	G1	Y3	R2	Y3 jumps horizontally from C12 to C10 over R2 in C11, removing it from the board.
3	G4		G2	R3	G3	R4	G3 jumps horizontally from C8 to C6 over R4 in C7, removing it from the board.
3	B1	G3			G3	R4	G3 jumps horizontally from C8 to C6 over R4 in C7, removing it from the board.
3		Y3			G3	R4	G3 jumps horizontally from C8 to C6 over R4 in C7, removing it from the board.
3	Y2	B4	Y4	G1	G3	R4	G3 jumps horizontally from C8 to C6 over R4 in C7, removing it from the board.
4	G4		G2	R3	B1	G3	B1 jumps horizontally from C5 to C7 over G3 in C6, removing it from the board.
4			B1		B1	G3	B1 jumps horizontally from C5 to C7 over G3 in C6, removing it from the board.
4		Y3			B1	G3	B1 jumps horizontally from C5 to C7 over G3 in C6, removing it from the board.
4	Y2	B4	Y4	G1	B1	G3	B1 jumps horizontally from C5 to C7 over G3 in C6, removing it from the board.
5	G4		G2	R3	B4	Y3	B4 jumps vertically from C14 to C6 over Y3 in C13, removing it from the board. Note that B4 and B1 both do not have a legal jump in this situation.
5		B4	B1		B4	Y3	B4 jumps vertically from C14 to C6 over Y3 in C13, removing it from the board. Note that B4 and B1 both do not have a legal jump in this situation.
5	Y2		Y4	G1	B4	Y3	B4 jumps vertically from C14 to C6 over Y3 in C13, removing it from the board. Note that B4 and B1 both do not have a legal jump in this situation.
6	G4	R3			G1	Y4	R3 jumps horizontally from C4 to C2 over G2 in C3, removing it from the board.
6		B4	B1		G1	Y4	R3 jumps horizontally from C4 to C2 over G2 in C3, removing it from the board.
6	Y2		Y4	G1	G1	Y4	R3 jumps horizontally from C4 to C2 over G2 in C3, removing it from the board.
7	G4	R3			G1	Y4	G1 jumps horizontally from C16 to C14 over Y4 in C15, removing it from the board.
7		B4	B1		G1	Y4	G1 jumps horizontally from C16 to C14 over Y4 in C15, removing it from the board.
7	Y2	G1			G1	Y4	G1 jumps horizontally from C16 to C14 over Y4 in C15, removing it from the board.
8	G4	R3			Y2	G1	Y2 jumps horizontally from C13 to C15 over G1 in C14, removing it from the board.
8		B4	B1		Y2	G1	Y2 jumps horizontally from C13 to C15 over G1 in C14, removing it from the board.
8			Y2		Y2	G1	Y2 jumps horizontally from C13 to C15 over G1 in C14, removing it from the board.
9			G4		G4	R3	G4 jumps horizontally from C1 to C3 over R3 in C2, removing it from the board.
9		B4	B1		G4	R3	G4 jumps horizontally from C1 to C3 over R3 in C2, removing it from the board.
9			Y2		G4	R3	G4 jumps horizontally from C1 to C3 over R3 in C2, removing it from the board.
9					G4	B1	G4 jumps vertically from C3 to C11 over B1 in C7, removing it from the board.
9		B4			G4	B1	G4 jumps vertically from C3 to C11 over B1 in C7, removing it from the board.
9			G4		G4	B1	G4 jumps vertically from C3 to C11 over B1 in C7, removing it from the board.
9			Y2		G4	B1	G4 jumps vertically from C3 to C11 over B1 in C7, removing it from the board.
10					Y2	G4	Y2 jumps vertically from C15 to C7 over G4 in C11, removing it from the board.
10		B4	Y2		Y2	G4	Y2 jumps vertically from C15 to C7 over G4 in C11, removing it from the board.
10					B4	Y2	B4 jumps horizontally from C6 to C8 over Y2 in C7, removing it from the board and ending the game. Alternatively, Y2 could jump B4 to win.
10				B4	B4	Y2	B4 jumps horizontally from C6 to C8 over Y2 in C7, removing it from the board and ending the game. Alternatively, Y2 could jump B4 to win.

==== Multiplayer Scarney ====
The same solitaire play mechanic of jumping pieces to remove them from the board is used in the multiplayer variants, including Scarney Singles (two to four players, each taking a turn to remove a piece), Scarney Doubles (limited to two players), and High-Low Scarney (a series of games that ends after one player scores more than 100 points).

== Card and dice games ==
Although Scarne stated in his 1966 autobiography he "refused to invent or market a parlor board game that makes use of dice, cards or spindles" because he disliked all forms of gambling, he later published both Skarney Kards (a card game, 1967) and Scarney Dice (a dice game, 1969).

=== Skarney Kards, Skarney ===
Skarney Kards (1967), also published as Skarney (1969), comes with two French-suited card decks and four jokers. The primary games use both decks and all four jokers shuffled together as either Skarney Partnership or Skarney Singles, and both are considered variants of rummy. Scarne also published rules for Skarney Gin, a two-player variant of gin rummy, using a single deck.

=== Scarney Dice ===
Scarney Dice (1969) uses five modified six-sided dice, in which the and sides of each die are replaced with the word "DEAD", so the game may be played with standard dice by considering the and faces "dead". To start, each player uses a cup to roll the five dice, and the player with the highest sum total, counting "dead" faces as 0, becomes the first "shooter"; the player with the second-highest sum is re-seated to the shooter's left, and seating continues in this manner.

Straight Scarney Dice scoring
Roll	Description	Live dice (Note: Because bonus points apply when the result is achieved on a single roll, this is the number of live dice required to achieve this bonus. For example, suppose the initial throw is and "dead"; the dead die is set aside and the four remaining live dice are re-rolled; it is impossible to achieve a "Big Scarney" or "five of a kind" with four live dice. If the re-roll is, that qualifies for the "two pair" bonus of +10 points. On the other hand, if the re-roll is and "dead", that means there are only three remaining live dice and the best possible bonus is now "three of a kind".)	Result (Note: Bonus points apply only when the result is achieved on a single roll.)
Big Scarney	Any five of a kind, including five "dead" dice	5	Instant win
Four of a kind	Numbers only	4–5	+40 bonus points
Full House	Three of a kind + one pair, numbers only	5	+30 bonus points
Little Scarney	Four dead dice	4–5	+25 bonus points
Three of a kind	Numbers only	3–5	+20 bonus points
Two pairs	Numbers only	4–5	+10 bonus points
Bonus hand	One, two, or three dead dice	2–4	Set aside dead dice & reroll; pips not counted

Each player contributes a predetermined ante to a common pot to start the first round, which Scarne calls a frame. Seven frames are played in a complete game.

The shooter then rolls the five dice in a cup. If one, two, or three dice are rolled "dead", these are set aside and the remaining "live" dice are re-rolled. If four dice are rolled "dead", that is a "Little Scarney" and the four dice are also set aside; the remaining "live" die is re-rolled. If five dice are rolled "dead", that is a "Big Scarney" and the shooter wins the match and pot. The process of re-rolling and setting aside "dead" dice continues until the shooter rolls an all-"live" result with the remaining dice.

Once an all-live throw is achieved, the shooter may choose to pass the dice to the player on their left, or "hit" by making an additional roll, in which the goal is to achieve another all-live throw. When the shooter passes, their score is the sum of that all-live throw, plus any applicable bonuses for results achieved on a single throw. If the shooter instead "hits" and makes another all-live throw, their score is the total of the two all-live throws, again adding any applicable bonuses. However, if the shooter misses by throwing one or more dead dice on the additional throw, they lose the points scored by the original all-live total, and are forced to re-roll after setting aside the dead dice until they achieve another all-live throw.

The shooter may choose to "double down" by announcing their intention and contributing an extra ante to the pot. This choice must be made prior to achieving any score, meaning the announcement must be made before the first throw, or before the first all-live throw. The double score applies only to the point value, not the bonus score.

When the shooter has one live die left, they may call "opposite" prior to revealing the throw, which means they accept the score on the opposite side of the die. For example, if they call "opposite" and roll a, their score is one, which is the opposite face from. In addition, when the shooter has one live die left and they choose to double, the double applies only when they throw a or a.

Once the shooter's score has been determined, the dice are passed to the player on their left, and the next player rolls the dice in a similar fashion to determine their score. If any player rolls a "Big Scarney", that is an instant win, and they take the entire pot; otherwise, the highest score wins the pot after all players have had a turn rolling the dice, completing the frame. The player on the left of the player who won that frame rolls first for the next frame.

=== Scarney 3000 ===
Scarney 3000 bonus points
Of a kind Face	3	4	5
Ace	100	200	3000
DEAD Scarney	200	400	3000
Three	300	600	3000
Four	400	800	3000
Six	600	1200	3000

Scarney 3000 is a variant that was included with the original Scarney Dice release; when the game was re-released, the name was changed to Scarney 3000 (1972), making this variant the default. For the 1972 game, the and faces were marked as "Scarney" instead of "DEAD". In Scarney 3000, the objective changes to be the first player to achieve a cumulative score of 3000. Any hand that contains one or two "dead" dice is scored as the sum of the face values plus fifty points for each "dead" die. In addition, bonuses apply when there are three, four, or five of a kind, with five of a kind with any face (including "dead" / "Scarney") scoring 3000 points, making that combination an instant win.

Throws with numbered pips in three or four of a kind are required to have at least one "dead" die to confirm the bonus applies. If the throw would qualify for a bonus with numbered pips but does not include a "dead" die, the three or four qualifying bonus dice are set aside and the remaining dice are re-rolled; if the re-roll includes a "dead" die, the bonus is "confirmed". It is also possible the re-roll could qualify for a larger bonus; for example, if the initial roll is, the initial bonus is for three of a kind (aces). Suppose the confirmation roll with the two remaining dice results in an, which means the player is now eligible for a bonus for four of a kind (aces), but still does not have a "dead" die to confirm the throw. The remaining die would be re-rolled again, which could result in either a "dead" face, confirming the four of a kind; another, qualifying for the five of a kind bonus; or another pip value (or), failing to "confirm" the result, in which case the hand is said to have "busted" and scores no points.

== Other games by Scarne ==
Schematic of Follow the Arrow

- Follow the Arrow (1947, 1964), a two-player game similar to Chinese checkers. It uses a board with a rectangular grid of spaces connected horizontally and vertically, laid out in five columns by six rows, and arrows governing movement between some of the spaces.
- Teeko (1937, 1952, 1964), another two-player game where the objective is to form a straight line or square with four like-colored pieces.
