= Charles Bouton =

Charles Bouton may refer to:

- Charles L. Bouton (1869–1922), American mathematician
- Charles Marie Bouton (1781–1853), French painter
