= Tri-nim =

Variation of Nim

Tri-Nim
- Designers: Hervey C. Hicks; Bruce Hicks
- Publishers: WFF 'N PROOF Games
- Publication: 1970; 55 years ago
- Genres: Abstract strategy game; Mathematical game
- Players: 2-3
- Playing time: 15-45 minutes
- Age range: 6+

Tri-nim is a mathematical abstract strategy game developed by brothers Bruce L. Hicks and Hervey C. Hicks and published by WFF 'N PROOF Games from 1970 to 1975. Players move pieces around a triangular board, attempting to score points by being the last to enter each of the corners. It is a variation on the strategy game Nim.

== Gameplay ==
Tri-nim is played on a game board that has on it an equilateral triangle cut into 36 smaller triangles. The centre triangles are marked with zeros, while the rest are marked with a point value from one to six moving towards the corners. Players take turns moving stacks of counters from the centre towards one of the three corners marked with a six. On their turn, a player can move any number of counters from a single triangle, but they must be moved parallel to an edge of the triangle and can only be moved to a higher number space if there are no possible triangles of lower or equal values.

A player gains control of a corner if their piece is the last to enter it. Points are awarded for each corner depending on the number of pieces on the triangle and the order in which it was cleared. The winner is the player with the most points by the time all counters have been moved into the triangle's corners.

== Reception ==
In a review of the game in Games & Puzzles No.41, David Wells praised it for its "ample entertainment and tactical possibilities." Marvin Kaye, writing for Galileo, concluded that the game was "an excellent abstract strategy game" but that "unless one is a game buff, one can become hopelessly confused as to the object of Tri-Nim, which is to finish last." In A Gamut of Games, Sid Sackson described Tri-nim as "the ultimate in Nim games."
