= Krypto (game) =

1963 card game by Daniel Yovich

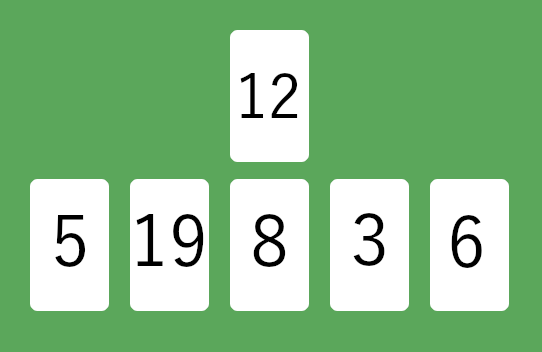
A spread of Krypto cards: players must find a way to calculate 12 using the numbers 5, 19, 8, 3 and 6

Krypto is a card game designed by Daniel Yovich in 1963 and published by Parker Brothers and MPH Games Co. It is a mathematical game that promotes proficiency with basic arithmetic operations. More detailed analysis of the game can raise more complex statistical questions.

== Rules ==
The Krypto deck consists of 56 cards: three of each of the numbers 1-6, four each of the numbers 7-10, two each of 11-17, one each of 18-25. Six cards are dealt: a common objective card at the top and five other cards below.

Each player must use all five of the cards' numbers exactly once, using any combination of arithmetic operations (addition, subtraction, multiplication, and division), to form the objective card's number. The first player to come up with a correct formula is the winner.

=== International tournament rules ===
The official international rules for Krypto differ slightly from the house rules, and they involve a system of scorekeeping.

Five cards are dealt face up in the center of the game table. (Each player works with the same set of five cards, rather than a set exclusive to them.) Then a sixth card is dealt face up in the center of the table that becomes the Objective Card. Each player commences (mentally) to mathematically manipulate the numbers of each card so that the last solution equals the Objective Card number. Krypto International Rules specify the use of whole numbers only, using addition, subtraction, division, multiplication and/or any combination thereof ... fractions, negative numbers or square rooting are not permitted. Each of the five cards must be used once and only once. The first player to solve the problem declares "Krypto" and has 30 seconds to explain the answer. When a player "Kryptos" and cannot relate the proper solution, a new hand is dealt and the hand is replayed. The player that errored receives a minus one point in the score box for that hand and is not eligible to play for a score for the replay of that hand.

Each hand must be solved within three minutes or a new hand is dealt.

Example of Play:

       Cards:  2, 1, 2, 2, 3 = 24 (Objective Card)
       2 x 1 =  2
       2 x 2 =  4
       4 x 2 =  8
       8 x 3 = 24 (Krypto)

All five cards were used once and only once to equal the Objective Card.

Another Example:

       Cards:  1, 3, 7, 1, 8 = 1 (Objective Card)
       3 - 1 =  2
       7 + 2 =  9
       9 / 1 =  9
       9 - 8 =  1 (Krypto)

Here is a more difficult hand:

       Cards:  24, 22, 23, 20, 21 = 1  (Objective Card)
       24 + 22 = 46
       46 / 23 =  2
        2 + 20 = 22
       22 - 21 =  1 (Krypto)

=== Score keeping ===
Ten hands of Krypto equal one game. Players receive one point for each "Krypto". Players receive double their previous hand score each time they "Krypto" repetitively in sequence. A score returns to "1" when sequence is broken. When players "Krypto" in error, they receive a minus one (-1) in the score box for that hand. They are also eliminated from play of that hand only and the hand is re-dealt for the remaining players. All players are then eligible to score the next hand unless another error in "Kryptoing" occurs.

Score ties are broken by playing additional hands.

Example — Krypto score pad
Players	Hand 1	Hand 2	Hand 3	Hand 4	Hand 5	Hand 6	Hand 7	Hand 8	Hand 9	Hand 10	Highest score wins	
Debbie	1						1				2	
Miguel		1									1	
Shelley			1	2	4					1	8	Winner
Kim						1					1	
Maria								1	2		3	

== Variations on the game ==
Although the numerical distribution of the official Krypto deck tends to provide for more balanced games, it is possible to play Krypto with any six numbers. Many programs exist on the internet that can generate six numbers and allow one to manipulate them with arithmetic operations. Because of the simple nature of the game, it is easy to program krypto on most scientific calculators. Versions of Krypto that only use a smaller range of numbers (such as 1-10) are better suited for beginners, while conversely, one could play a game of Krypto with a larger range of numbers that would be more difficult.

=== Variation for two players ===
With a 56 card version, deal 11 hands of 5 cards each face down. The last card is the object (goal) for each hand. When ready, each player picks up a hand and tries to form a Krypto. If a player thinks they’ve got it, they call out Krypto and the other player must stop looking at their chosen hand. The one who called Krypto must show it to the satisfaction of their opponent. If they are correct, they put the hand down on their side of the table and pick up another hand. If they do not have a Krypto, the other player can either just return the hand face down to the table with no penalty or can penalize the false Kryptoer by subtracting one hand from their total at the end of the round/game. At any time, either player may return their hand face down to the table and pick up another one - as often as they want. When only one hand remains on the table, it is opened face up and the players mentally (without touching the cards) try for a Krypto.

The winner is the one who has Kryptoed more hands.

As an optional second round, replace all hands face down and use ZERO as the new goal. If you want a third round with the same hands, redo using 100 as a goal. You will find zero on the easy side (where speed becomes a specific advantage) and 100 on the difficult side.

Side point: The original Krypto deck has 52 cards. If you have such a deck, play with 10 hands and two rounds with goals set by the other two cards - reveal the goals one at a time for each of the two game rounds. Ties can be broken by a round with zero as the goal and/or 100.

== Reviews ==
- Games #10

== See also ==
- 24 (puzzle)
- Countdown (game show)#Number round
