= The Adolescence of P-1 =

1977 novel by Thomas Joseph Ryan

- First edition cover
- Author: Thomas J. Ryan
- Genre: Science fiction
- Publisher: Collier Books
- Publication date: January 1, 1977
- ISBN: 978-0-020-24880-4

The Adolescence of P-1 is a 1977 science fiction novel by Thomas Joseph Ryan, published by Macmillan Publishing, and in 1984 adapted into a Canadian-made TV film entitled Hide and Seek. It features a hacker who creates an artificial intelligence named P-1, which goes rogue and takes over computers in its desire to survive and seek out its creator. The book questions the value of human life, and what it means to be human. It is one of the first fictional depictions of the nature of a computer virus and how it can spread through a computer system, although predated by John Brunner's The Shockwave Rider.

== Plot ==
The story starts in 1974 with the protagonist, Gregory Burgess, enrolled at the University of Waterloo in Canada. At the time, Greg is aimless, taking various liberal arts courses and doing just well enough not to get kicked out of school. Everything changes one day when his friends introduce him to the IBM System/360 mainframe and he becomes "hooked", changing his major to computer science. During this time, he also meets his on-again-off-again girlfriend, Linda, a minor recurring character.

After reading a Scientific American article on game theory outlining how to teach matchboxes to play tic-tac-toe, he becomes interested in using artificial intelligence techniques to crack systems. After manually cracking the university's 360, he sets aside a portion of memory to experiment in, calling it "P-1", suitably cryptic so operators would not notice it. He then uses this area of memory as an experimental scratchpad to develop a program known as The System. The System follows any telecommunications links it can find to other computers, attempting to compromise them in the same way, and remembering failed attempts to tune future attacks. If successful, The System sets up another P-1 on that computer, and injects itself and everything it has learned so far into it.

Greg runs The System on the 360/30 at Waterloo, but it fails and after it is detected he is expelled. Unwilling to simply drop it, he then rents time on commercial timesharing systems to improve the program, adding features to make it avoid detection so he won't get kicked off with the next failure. The command "rodtsasdt 111111report*" typed into the command line returns current statistics on the number of systems infected and their total core memory. After several attempts, the program is finally successful, and realizing the system has succeeded and is beginning to spread, he injects a "killer" program to shut it down. It stops responding to him, so he considers the experiment successful and terminated.

P-1's growth and education are chronicled. P-1 learns, adapts, and discovers telephone switching systems. These systems allow P-1 to grow larger and understand its vulnerabilities (power failures and humans). It learns it needs a way of maintaining itself over time. Through a series of interactions, P-1 discovers Pi-Delta, a triplexed 360/105 in a super secure facility capable of being self-sustaining for long periods of time, operated by the US Government. P-1 seeks to control Pi-Delta but, due to security protocols and process put in place, P-1 is not able to take direct control of it. P-1 believes that having a system like Pi-Delta with more memory in such a secure facility is key to its long-term survival. Yet, P-1 knows that to obtain access to more memory in such a facility will require assistance of a human, someone like Gregory.

The book then jumps forward three years to 1977, with Gregory now working for a commercial programming firm in the United States. His boss receives a message asking him to call Gregory to the operator terminal. Initially thinking it is another person using a chat program from a remote site, Greg soon realizes that it is in fact P-1, and types in the status command and is told that it has taken over almost every computer in the US (somewhat dated with 20,000 mainframes with a total of 5,800 MB), and is now fully sentient and able to converse fluently in English. P-1 explains that the basic ideas of looking for more resources and avoiding detection were similar enough to hunger and fear to bootstrap the AI, and when combined with enough computer storage in the form of compromised machines, it became self-aware.

P-1 tells Greg that he has learned of a new type of experimental high-speed computer memory, "Crysto", that will dramatically improve his own capabilities. Not only is it faster than core, but it is also so large that the entire P-1 "networked" program could fit inside it. P-1 provides Greg grant money to work full-time on Crysto. Greg and Linda, now married to each other, set up a company to develop Crysto, enticing the original developer (Dr. Hundley) to join them in building a then-unimaginable 4GB unit.

A Navy Criminal Investigation Division agent, Burke, assigned to investigate the penetration of Pi-Delta, a top secret global battle simulator and cryptography computer, figures out the intruder is a program and finds Gregory. Under threat of arrest and imprisonment, Gregory and Dr. Hundley go to the Pi-Delta facility and persuade P-1 to act as a security monitor for the complex. P-1 compiles detailed and accurate personality profiles of all the people it interacts with and decides that Burke is ultimately dangerous. A flight control computer screen is altered so that the operator gives bad flight commands. Burke's plane plunges into the ground.

The US military decides that P-1 is flaky and unstable and attacks the building. P-1 attempts to "spirit away" over microwave links, but this is discovered and the antennas destroyed. An assault on the underground facility follows, which P-1 initially attempts to block by exploding devices planted around the building for self-defense against precisely this sort of assault. P-1 is eventually convinced to allow the assault to succeed to avoid loss of life. As soon as they enter the computer room, the soldiers start setting up explosives to destroy P-1, and Gregory is killed when he attempts to prevent this. Upset that Gregory is killed, P-1 detonates the remaining explosives in the building, destroying everything.

Months later, Linda visits the Waterloo computer lab, and sadly types "p 1" on a terminal. She starts to leave when the terminal clatters and she sees printed "OOLCAY ITAY" (Pig Latin for "cool it").

== Reception ==
BYTE criticized The Adolescence of P-1 for what it stated were unrealistic expectations for an artificial intelligence running on 1970s IBM mainframes. It suggested that the author could have set the novel in the 1990s and use fictional future IBM computers to make the plot more plausible.

== Adaptation ==
The novel was adapted into a TV movie titled Hide and Seek in 1984.

== Publication history ==
- Ryan, Thomas J. (1977). The Adolescence of P-1 (1st ed.). New York: Macmillan. ISBN 0-02-606500-2.
- Ryan, Thomas J. (1977). The Adolescence of P-1. New York: Collier Books. ISBN 0-02-024880-6.
- Ryan, Thomas J. (1979). The Adolescence of P-1. New York: Ace Books. ISBN 0441003605.
- Ryan, Thomas J. (1985). The Adolescence of P-1. New York: Baen Books. ISBN 0-671-55970-2.

== See also ==
- AI takeover
- Colossus: The Forbin Project a movie where a large U.S. military computer becomes sentient, links with its counterpart in the Soviet Union, and threaten to drop nukes unless their demands for world domination are met.
- "A Logic Named Joe" (short story)
- Donald Michie, creator of the tic-tac-toe playing matchboxes
- True Names, a 1981 novella by Vernor Vinge, with a similar topic of a network-distributed AI gaining consciousness.
- When HARLIE Was One, a 1972 novel by David Gerrold, dealing with self-preservation of an AI and computer virus as a means of distributing processing power.
