= Android Nim =

1978 video game

- Publisher: 80-NW Publishing
- Programmers: Leo Christopherson (TRS); Don Dennis (PET)
- Platforms: Apple II, PET, TRS-80
- Release: 1978: TRS-80; July 1979: PET; 1980: Apple II
- Genre: Strategy
- Mode: Single-player

Android Nim is a computerized version of the strategy game Nim programmed by Leo Christopherson for the TRS-80 and published in 1978 by 80-NW Publishing. A port to the Commodore PET by Don Dennis was released in July 1979, followed by an Apple II version in 1980.

Android Nim is played versus the computer. The stones or other objects of traditional Nim are replaced by androids; their animation was considered impressive in 1978.

== Gameplay ==
The object of the game is to remove the last android from three rows of androids. The game's premise is simple, but its animation is impressive given the limitations of the TRS-80's display. Throughout the game androids are animated to face different directions, as if bored or engaging in conversation with one another.

Intro screen

The game starts with three rows of androids which contain 7, 5, and 3 androids respectively. An animated android asks the player if they would like to go first. The player chooses a row and types in how many droids to remove. An animated droid at the head of the row then nods its head and raises a gun and the other androids turn to look at the selected row. The specified number of androids are then zapped with a laser beam. It is then the computer's turn—with similar effect—and play continues until the last android is removed.

If the human wins, the computer is an amusingly poor sport and displays astonishment; if it wins, the computer displays a huge "I WIN!". If the computer is about to lose, it pretends to seek futile ways to avoid losing (i.e., by selecting more androids than are available in a given row) before giving up.

== Reception ==
The game was reviewed in The Dragon #44 by Mark Herro. Herro stated, "if you want a good 'demo' program or just a little light entertainment — I think you could do worse than to try out this game. I like Android Nim."
