= John Scarne =

American magician (1903–1985)

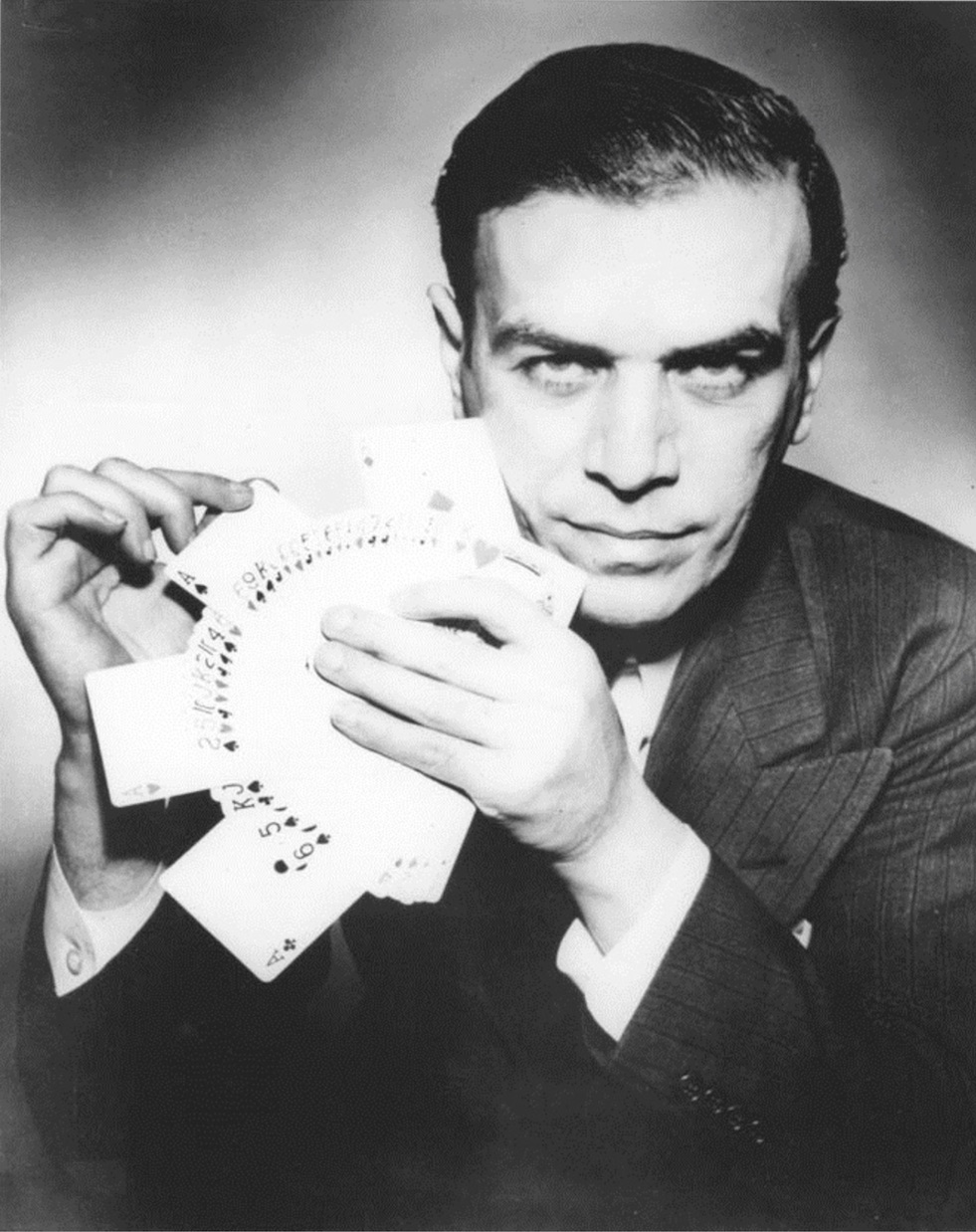
- Born: Orlando Carmelo Scarnecchia; March 4, 1903; Steubenville, Ohio, United States
- Died: July 7, 1985 (aged 82); North Bergen, New Jersey, United States
- Occupations: Magician, writer

John Scarne (/ˈskɑːrni/ SKAR-nee; born Orlando Carmelo Scarnecchia; March 4, 1903 – July 7, 1985) was an American magician and author who was particularly adept at playing card manipulation. He became known as an expert on cards and other games, and authored a number of popular books on cards, gambling, and related topics.

== Early life ==
He was born Orlando Carmelo Scarnecchia in Steubenville, Ohio, United States, and at some point anglicized his name to "John Scarne". He grew up in the New Jersey communities of Fairview and Guttenberg. When he left school after the eighth grade, he learned from a local card sharp how to perform such swindles as The Three Card Monte, and how to cheat in gambling card games by manipulating the cards.

Scarne began practicing sleight of hand with the goal of becoming a card sharp, but his Roman Catholic mother dissuaded her son from gambling in general, and cheating others in particular. She persuaded him to practice magic instead.

One of Scarne's influences was Nate Leipzig. Of Leipzig, Scarne said, "Whatever I can do, is because Nate Leipzig showed me how to do it." Scarne soon extended his skill at handling cards to learning—and devising—magical effects with cards. He spent a few months learning about crooked gambling devices (including marked cards and loaded dice) at a nearby novelty store. Thanks to his endless practice, Scarne began making money as a magician.

== Career ==
Gradually, Scarne became an expert at not only magical effects, but games of all kinds as well. Articles were written about him in various magazines, and he was hired as a consultant or adviser by various companies, as well as by the US Army, which sent him to bases around the world in order to educate soldiers about the dangers of card and dice cheats. He wrote fifteen books and co-wrote a few more for a total of twenty-eight books on games, including Scarne on Dice, Scarne's Guide to Modern Poker and Scarne's New Complete Guide to Gambling. He also wrote two autobiographies: The Amazing World of John Scarne: A Personal History (1956), and The Odds Against Me (1966). He served as a technical advisor in the 1973 motion picture The Sting, and doubled for actor Paul Newman's hands during scenes that involved card manipulations and deck switching.

Board games by Scarne

Teeko (1952, 1964) aka Teko (1945)

Scarney (1962) aka Scarnie (1931) and Scar-Nee (1956)

Scarne was a card manipulator. He liked inventing (and marketing, through his company John Scarne Games, Inc.) new games, which he did quite a bit. And he was especially proud of one called Teeko, which he invented in 1945 (version withdrawn), re-invented in 1952 and modified in the 1960s. He was so proud of the game that he named his son John Teeko Scarne. Teeko quickly spread around the world. However, Scarne never made a profit on the game, mainly due to water damage in a warehouse which destroyed the entire stock of Teeko sets in one day. Today Teeko is virtually unknown.

Scarne's most famous card trick was titled "Scarne's Aces". The trick involved taking a spectator's shuffled deck of cards, performing a series of riffle shuffles himself and then cutting to all four aces. Another one of Scarne's most notable card effects was the triple coincidence, in which a spectator and a magician each pick three different playing cards out of two regular decks of opposite colors and it is shown that all of the selections match. Scarne also created a quadruple coincidence, wherein a spectator selects a card and four apparently impossible predictions of their card are made.

Scarne also attempted to discredit Edward O. Thorp's card counting system for the game of blackjack. In his 1966 autobiography The Odds Against Me, he analyzed Thorp's system and concluded that the whole system was loaded with mathematical errors, and that it was pure fiction dreamed by Thorp. Scarne also dismissed Wilson's famous blackjack point count system as "hokum". Scarne offered a challenge to blackjack card counters, but the prospective participants were never able to agree upon its terms.

In The Odds Against Me, Scarne described his own technique for counting down up to four-deck blackjack with the rules generally used in Las Vegas in 1947: Scarne made use of his stacks of chips as a device to help track the contents of the undealt cards. A more complete description of his technique is present in his later book, Scarne's Guide to Casino Gambling, where he also described preventative measures taken by casinos to combat card counting.

== Personal life ==
Scarne married Steffi Storm (née Norma Kearney) in 1955, with their son John born the same year. Scarne died on July 7, 1985, at 82, while living in North Bergen, New Jersey.

== Publications ==
- Scarne on Dice (1945)
- Scarne on Cards (1949) (Mentioned in Ian Fleming's Moonraker (1955), where Bond reads this book.)
- Scarne on Card Tricks (1950)
- Scarne's Magic Tricks (1953)
- Scarne on Teeko (1955)
- The Amazing World of John Scarne (1956)
- Scarne’s Complete Guide To Gambling (1961)
- The Odds Against Me (1966)
- Scarne's Encyclopedia of Games (1973)
- The Mafia Conspiracy (1976)
- Scarne's Guide to Casino Gambling (1978)
