= Teeko =

Board game

Teeko game board

Teeko is an abstract strategy game invented by John Scarne in 1937 and rereleased in refined form in 1952 and again in the 1960s. Teeko was marketed by Scarne's company, John Scarne Games Inc.; its quirky name, he said, borrowed letters from the games Tic-tac-toe, Chess, Checkers, and Bingo.

== Standard Teeko ==
Standard Teeko is also known as Teeko 44 Positions and is a game for two players.

=== Equipment ===
The Teeko board consists of twenty-five spaces arranged in a five-by-five grid. There are eight markers, four black and four red; in the final edition of the game (1964), the markers are marked with one to four spots similar to the standard pips on dice.

One player, "Black" plays the black markers, and the other, "Red", plays the red.

=== Gameplay ===
One player conceals two pawns in their closed hands, one of each color. The other player selects one hand and plays the color that is revealed.

Teeko game, won by Black for placing four in a square

1. Black moves first and places one marker on any space on the board, with the exception of the central spot on the board.
2. Red then places a marker on any unoccupied space.
3. Players continue to take turns placing markers on empty spaces until all eight markers are on the board.
4. Once all eight pieces are on the board, if neither player has won after this initial "drop" placement phase, then they move their pieces one at a time, with Black playing first.
5. A piece may be moved only to an empty space adjacent to its starting space, meaning adjacent horizontally, vertically, or diagonally, as indicated by the connecting lines on the board.

=== Objective ===
The object of the game is for either player to win by having all four of their markers in a straight line (vertical, horizontal, or diagonal) or on a square of four adjacent spaces. Adjacency is horizontal, vertical, or diagonal, but does not wrap around the edges of the board. The 44 positions name comes from the number of ways in which four in a row or the small square can be created.

Winning combinations in Standard Teeko (black pawns)
	Vertical	Horizontal	Diagonal	Square
Example				
Ways to form	10	10	8	16

If a player wins by completing four-in-a-row or a small square, the score for the game is based on the pip value of the last marker placed or moved to win, and the position of that last marker on the board. When the last marker is played onto the center or one of the four corners of the board, the player receives a bonus of four points in addition to the pip value; plays into one of the other 20 spots on the board receive just the pip value with no bonus.

=== Analysis ===
The rules, as summarized above, are very simple, but the strategy is complicated enough to fill a book, Scarne on Teeko (1955). Nonetheless, Guy L. Steele Jr. solved the game (i.e., showed what must occur if both players play perfectly) via computer in 1998 and found neither player can force a win. Steele also showed that the Advanced Teeko variant is a win for Black (again, assuming perfect play), as is one other variant, but the other fourteen variants are draws.

== Variations and history ==
According to Scarne, the idea for Teeko started when he devised a winning strategy for Nim; since it had sixteen distinct starting moves, it was relatively easy to memorize how to counter each one; to solve this issue, he later developed the game Scarne in the early 1930s to have 252 distinct starting positions, which later was withdrawn and rereleased as Scar-Nee (1950) and Scarney (1961). Scarne had 5000 copies of Scarne printed in 1934 but only sold 300 after a month of live demonstrations at Macy's; to prevent his mother from learning it was not successful, he destroyed the remainder by fire.

At about the same time that he released the initial version of Scarne, Scarne also started examining the game of tic-tac-toe, which has nine starting moves, and began developing what would eventually become Teeko. When it was released initially in 1945, the game was named Teko and used a 4×4 board. The name Teko is derived from the letters "T" from Tic-tac-toe, "E" from chEss, "K" from checKers, and "O" from bingO. The game received its updated name of Teeko in the 1950s, and Scarne released the final version in 1964.

To promote the game, Scarne held a challenge in 1955 to play Teeko against ten different opponents, promising US$1000 to each player that could take two out of three rounds from him, which received attention from newspapers. Scarne ended up winning all ten matches, but did not receive publicity for this feat afterward. After the final version of the game was released, the inventory was destroyed during a fire at the company that was hired to store and distribute the products of John Scarne Games, and Teeko fell into relative obscurity.

Winning combinations in Advanced Teeko variants (red pawns)
	9-cell square	16-cell square	25-cell square	Small diamond	Large diamond
Example					
Ways to form	9	4	1	9	1

There are sixteen variations of Teeko which have slightly different rules, with the primary variants being Alternate Teeko and Advanced Teeko. All sixteen are outlined in Scarne on Teeko; the rules above are for "Standard Teeko" (or "Teeko"). In Alternate Teeko, the opponent may dictate where a piece is placed during the opening "drop" phase; i.e., when it is Black's turn to place a new piece, Red can either point to where the piece should go, or pass the privilege back to Black. This alternate rule may be applied to one, two, three, or all four pieces placed by an opponent during the drop phase, for the first or last of the dropped pieces, which gives seven distinct variations. For example, in the "One-Move Alternate" variant, the 1st drop is played by Alternate rules followed by the 2nd through 4th drops played with Standard rules, denoted as 1A/3S; the other variants are "Two-Move Alternate" (2A/2S), "Three-Move Alternate" (3A/1S), "Alternate" (4A), "One-Move Standard" (1S/3A), "Two-Move Standard" (2S/2A), and "Three-Move Standard" (3S/1A).

Advanced Teeko adds more winning conditions, including "extended" 9-, 16-, or 25-cell squares for 58 winning positions in total (Teeko 58 Positions) or small or large right-angle diamond / rhombus shapes. In Advanced Teeko, players may choose an additional variation in which they are awarded bonus points for creating the extended shapes, as there are fewer ways to make them.

Steele showed that Advanced Teeko is a win for Black (assuming, again, that both players play perfectly), as is one other variation, but the other fourteen are draws.

== See also ==
- Connect Four
- Connect6
- Seega
