= Frederik Schuh =

Dutch mathematician

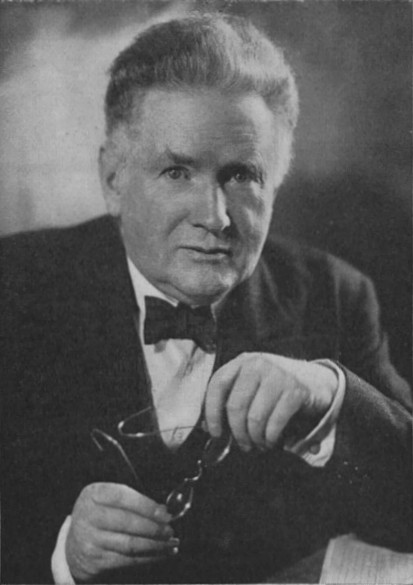
Frederik Schuh

Frederik Schuh (7 February 1875, Amsterdam – 6 January 1966, The Hague) was a Dutch mathematician.

== Career ==
He completed his PhD in algebraic geometry from Amsterdam University in 1905, where his advisor was Diederik Johannes Korteweg. He taught at the Technische Hoogeschool at Delft (1907–1909 and 1916–1945) and at Groningen (1909–1916).

== Works ==
He was the inventor of the Chomp game and wrote The Master Book of Mathematical Recreations (1943).
