= Hexapawn =

Two-player game invented by Martin Gardner

	a	b	c
3	a3 black pawn	b3 black pawn	c3 black pawn	3
2	a2	b2	c2	2
1	a1 white pawn	b1 white pawn	c1 white pawn	1
	a	b	c

3x3 Hexapawn setup

a4 black pawn	b4 black pawn	c4 black pawn	d4 black pawn
a3	b3	c3	d3
a2	b2	c2	d2
a1 white pawn	b1 white pawn	c1 white pawn	d1 white pawn

4x4 Octopawn setup

Hexapawn is a deterministic two-player game invented by Martin Gardner. It is played on a rectangular board of variable size, for example on a 3×3 board or on a regular chessboard. On a board of size n×m, each player begins with m pawns, one for each square in the row closest to them. The goal of each player is to either advance a pawn to the opposite end of the board or leave the other player with no legal moves (akin to stalemate), including by capturing all of their pawns.

Hexapawn on the 3×3 board is a solved game; with perfect play, White will always lose in 3 moves (1.b2 axb2 2.cxb2 c2 3.a2 c1#). Indeed, Gardner specifically constructed it as a game with a small game tree in order to demonstrate how it could be played by a heuristic AI implemented by a mechanical computer based on Donald Michie's Matchbox Educable Noughts and Crosses Engine (MENACE).

A variant of this game is octopawn, which is played on a 4×4 board with 4 pawns on each side. It is a forced win for White in 5.5 moves with optimal play (beginning with 1.a2 or 1.d2).

Only 24 matchboxes are required for a hexapawn version of Matchbox Educable Noughts and Crosses Engine.

== Rules ==
As in chess, a pawn may be moved in two different ways: it may be moved one square vertically forward, or it may capture a pawn one square diagonally ahead of it. A pawn may not be moved forward if there is a pawn in the next square. Unlike chess, the first move of a pawn may not advance it by two spaces. A player loses if they have no legal moves or one of the other player's pawns reaches the end of the board.

== Octopawn ==
Octopawn is a variant of hexapawn played on a 4×4 grid with the same rules as hexapawn. It is mentioned by Gardner in "The Unexpected hanging and Other Mathematical Diversions":

Richard L. Sites, at M.I.T., wrote a FORTRAN program for an IBM 1620 so that it would learn to play Octapawn, a 4 x 4 version of hexapawn that begins with four white pawns on the first row and four black pawns on the fourth row. He reports that the first player has a sure win with a corner opening.

In recent years, advances in computing has allowed the entire game tree of Octopawn to be computed using an average personal computer. An analysis of the game tree reveals that there are 11,420 unique game states and 2,330,356 unique games. The shortest game is 5 turns long(e.g. 1.d2 b3 2.d3 b2 3.dxc4#), and the longest game is 17 turns long(e.g. 1.d2 b3 2.d3 cxd3 3.c2 d2 4.c3 b2 5.axb2 dxc3 6.b3 c2 7.bxc2 axb3 8.c3 b2 9.c4#). The distribution of game lengths approximately follows a normal distribution curve with a center of 13 turns.

== Dawson's chess ==
Whenever a player advances a pawn to the penultimate rank and attacks an opposing pawn, there is a threat to proceed to the final rank by capture. The opponent's only sensible responses, therefore, are to either capture the advanced pawn or advance the threatened one, the latter only being sensible in the case that there is one threatened pawn rather than two. If one restricts 3×N hexapawn with the additional rule that capturing is always compulsory, the result is the game Dawson's chess. The game was invented by Thomas Rayner Dawson in 1935.

Dawson's chess reduces to the impartial game denoted .137 in Conway's notation. This means that it is equivalent to a Nim-like game in which:

- on a turn, the player may remove one to three objects from a heap,
- removing just one object is a legal move only if the removed object is the only object in the heap, and
- when removing three objects from a heap of five or more, the player may also split the remainder into two heaps.

The initial position is a single heap of size N. The nim-sequence for this game is

0.1120311033224052233011302110452740
  1120311033224455233011302110453748
  1120311033224455933011302110453748
  1120311033224455933011302110453748
  1120311033224455933011302110453748 ...,

where bold entries indicate the values that differ from the eventual periodic behavior of the sequence.

== Sources ==
- Mathematical Games, Scientific American, March 1962, reprinted in The Unexpected Hanging and Other Mathematical Diversions, by Martin Gardner, pp. 93ff
