= The Schoolmaster's Assistant, Being a Compendium of Arithmetic Both Practical and Theoretical =

1743 arithmetic book by Thomas Dilworth

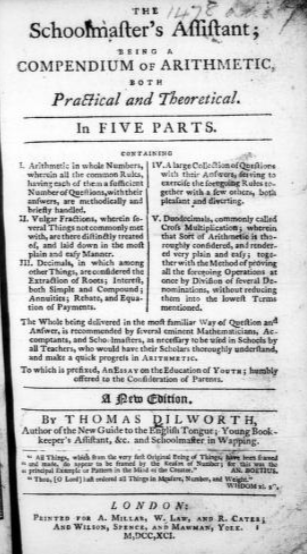
- Title page for The Schoolmaster's Assistant, Being a Compendium of Arithmetic Both Practical and Theoretical (1791 edition)
- Author: Thomas Dilworth
- Subject: Arithmetic
- Published: 1743
- Publication place: England

The Schoolmaster's Assistant, Being a Compendium of Arithmetic both Practical and Theoretical was an early and popular English arithmetic textbook, written by Thomas Dilworth and first published in England in 1743. An American edition was published in 1769; by 1786 it had reached 23 editions, and through 1800 it was the most popular mathematics text in America.

== Sections ==
Although different editions of the book varied in content according to the whims of their publishers, most editions of the book reached from the introductory topics to the advanced in five sections:

- Section I, Whole Numbers included the basis of the four operations and proceeded to topics on interest, rebates, partnership, weights and measures, the double rule of three, alligation, mediation and permutations.
- Section II dealt with common fractions.
- Section III dealt with decimal fraction operations and included roots up to the fourth power, and work on annuities and pensions.
- Section IV was a collection of 104 word problems to be solved. As was common in many older texts, the questions were sometimes stated in rhyme. Lessons for students were for memorization and recitation.
- Section V was on duodecimals, working with fractions in which the only denominators were twelfths. These types of problems continue in textbooks and appear in the 1870 edition of White's Complete Arithmetic in the appendix. The definition states: A Duodecimal is a denominate number in which twelve units of any denomination make a unit of the next higher denomination. Duodecimals are used by artificers in measuring surfaces and solids.
