= Charles L. Bouton =

American mathematician (1869–1922)

Charles Leonard Bouton
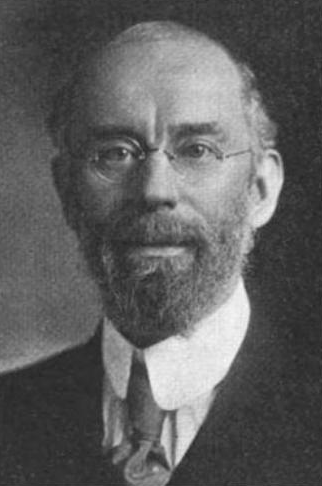
- Born: April 25, 1869; St. Louis
- Died: February 20, 1922 (aged 52); Cambridge
- Resting place: Mount Auburn Cemetery
- Education: Washington University in St. Louis; Leipzig University
- Occupation(s): mathematician, university teacher
- Employer(s): Washington University in St. Louis; Harvard University
- Spouse: Mary G. Spencer (m. 1907)

Charles Leonard Bouton (April 25, 1869 – February 20, 1922) was an American mathematician.

== Early life and education ==
Charles L. Bouton was born in St. Louis, Missouri, where his father was an engineer. He studied in the public schools of St. Louis. He later received a Master of Science degree from Washington University in St. Louis. In 1898 he received his doctorate from Leipzig University. His Ph.D. advisor was Sophus Lie.

He married Mary G. Spencer in Baltimore on June 15, 1907.

== Teaching ==
He taught at the Smith Academy, Washington University and Harvard University. From 1900 to 1902 Bouton was an editor of the Bulletin of the American Mathematical Society.

He died at his home in Cambridge, Massachusetts on February 20, 1922.

== Publications ==
In 1902 Bouton published a solution of the game Nim. This result is today viewed as the birth of combinatorial game theory.
