= Chomp =

Abstract strategy game

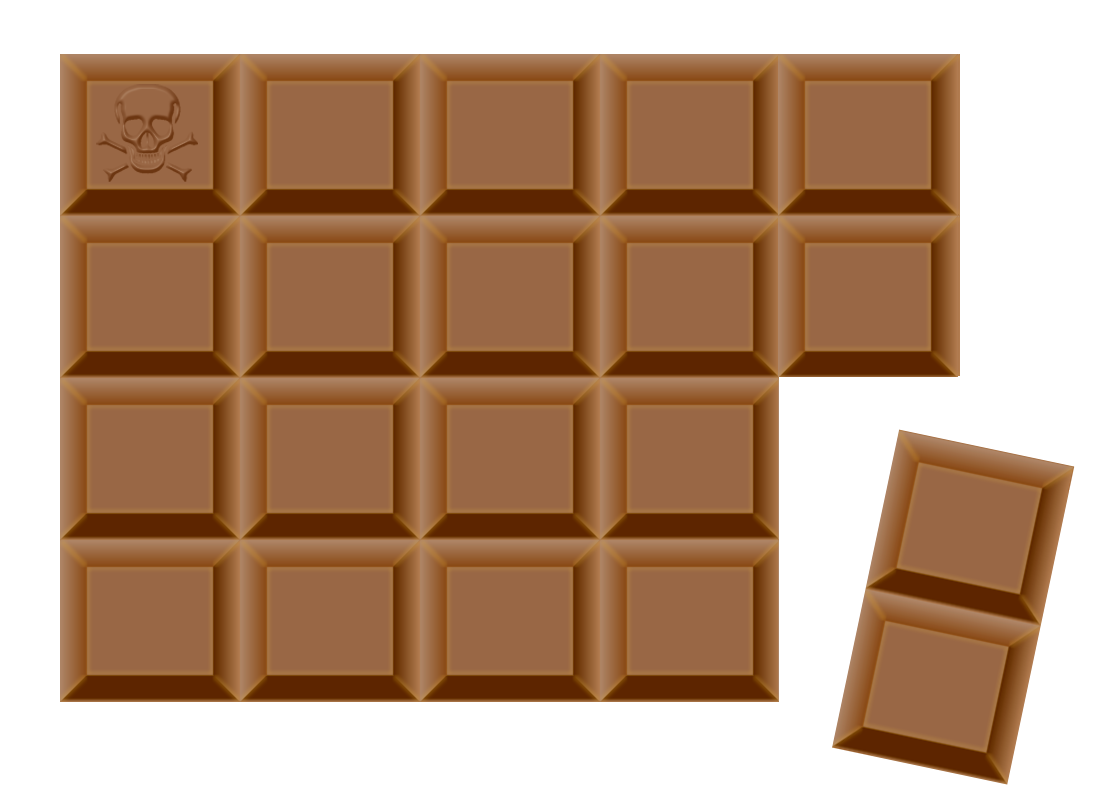
A move in the game of Chomp, removing two blocks: a player has chosen a block to "eat", and must also eat the block below it. The top-left block is "poisoned" and whoever eats it loses the game.

Chomp is a two-player strategy game played on a rectangular grid made up of smaller square cells, which can be thought of as the blocks of a chocolate bar. The players take it in turns to choose one block and "eat it" (remove from the board), together with those that are below it and to its right. The top left block is "poisoned" and the player who eats it loses.

The chocolate-bar formulation of Chomp is due to David Gale, but an equivalent game expressed in terms of choosing divisors of a fixed integer was published earlier by Frederik Schuh.

Chomp is a special case of a poset game where the partially ordered set on which the game is played is a product of total orders with the minimal element (poisonous block) removed.

== Example game ==
Below shows the sequence of moves in a typical game starting with a 4 × 5 bar:

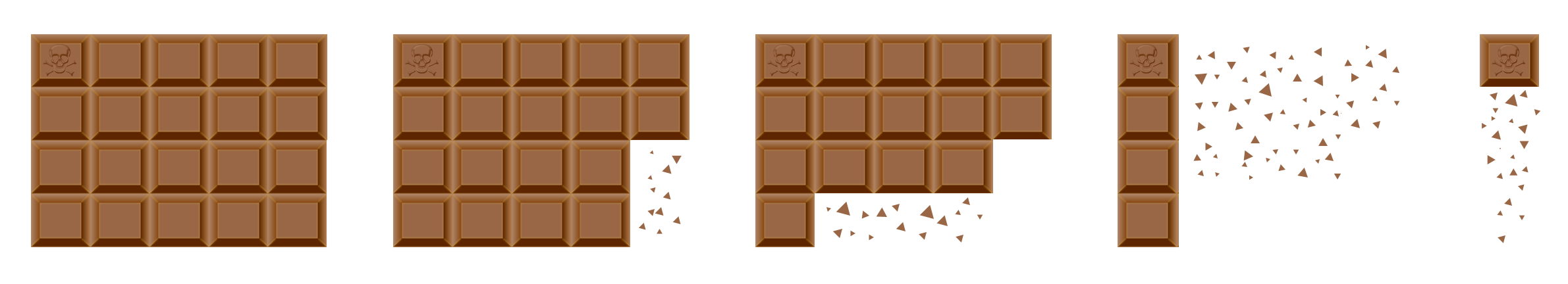

Player A eats two blocks from the bottom right corner; Player B eats three from the bottom row; Player A picks the block to the right of the poisoned block and eats eleven blocks; Player B eats three blocks from the remaining column, leaving only the poisoned block. Player A must eat the last block and so loses.

Note that since it is provable that player A can win when starting from a 4 × 5 bar, at least one of A's moves is a mistake.

== Positions of the game ==
The intermediate positions in an m × n Chomp are integer-partitions (non-increasing sequences of positive integers) λ_{1} ≥ λ_{2} ≥···≥ λ_{r}, with λ_{1} ≤ n and r ≤ m. Their number is the binomial coefficient $\binom{m+n}{n}$, which grows exponentially with m and n.

== Winning the game ==
Chomp belongs to the category of impartial two-player perfect information games, making it also analyzable by Nim because of the Sprague–Grundy theorem.

For any rectangular starting position, other than 1×1, the first player can win. This can be shown using a strategy-stealing argument: assume that the second player has a winning strategy against any initial first-player move. Suppose then, that the first player takes only the bottom right hand square. By our assumption, the second player has a response to this which will force victory. But if such a winning response exists, the first player could have played it as their first move and thus forced victory. The second player therefore cannot have a winning strategy.

Computers can easily calculate winning moves for this game on two-dimensional boards of reasonable size. However, as the number of positions grows exponentially, this is infeasible for larger boards.

For a square starting position (i.e., n × n for any n ≥ 2), the winning strategy can easily be given explicitly. The first player should present the second with an L shape of one row and one column only, of the same length, connected at the poisonous square. Then, whatever the second player does on one arm of the L, the first player replies with the same move on the second arm, always presenting the second player again with a symmetric L shape. Finally, this L will degenerate into the single poisonous square, and the second player would lose.

Similarly, any n × 2 (for any n ≥ 2) is also trivial. The winning starting move is always the bottom right square. The board after this move can be thought of as two vertical chains of squares (ignoring the poisoned square), and to win, simply mimic player 2's moves on the other chain. Other paths to victory are often more complicated however.

== Generalisations of Chomp ==
Three-dimensional Chomp has an initial chocolate bar of a cuboid of blocks indexed as (i,j,k). A move is to take a block together with any block all of whose indices are greater or equal to the corresponding index of the chosen block. In the same way, Chomp can be generalised to any number of dimensions.

Chomp is sometimes described numerically. An initial natural number is given, and players alternate choosing positive divisors of the initial number, but may not choose 1 or a multiple of a previously chosen divisor. This game models n-dimensional Chomp, where the initial natural number has n prime factors and the dimensions of the Chomp board are given by the exponents of the primes in its prime factorization. Ordinal Chomp is played on an infinite board with some of its dimensions ordinal numbers: for example a 2 × (ω + 4) bar. A move is to pick any block and remove all blocks with both indices greater than or equal the corresponding indices of the chosen block. The case of ω × ω × ω Chomp is a notable open problem; a $100 reward has been offered for finding a winning first move.

More generally, Chomp can be played on any partially ordered set with a least element. A move is to remove any element along with all larger elements. A player loses by taking the least element.

All varieties of Chomp can also be played without resorting to poison by using the misère play convention: The player who eats the final chocolate block is not poisoned, but simply loses by virtue of being the last player. This is identical to the ordinary rule when playing Chomp on its own, but differs when playing the disjunctive sum of Chomp games, where only the last final chocolate block loses.

== See also ==
- Nim
- Hackenbush
