= Thomas Dilworth =

English cleric and author

The Reverend Mr. Thomas Dilworth (died 1780) was an English cleric and author of a widely used schoolbook, both in Great Britain and America, A New Guide to the English Tongue. Noah Webster as a boy studied Dilworth's book, and was inspired partly by it to create his own spelling book on completely different principles, using pictures and stories of interest to children. By some accounts Dilworth was one of the few schoolbooks used by Abraham Lincoln. Published in 1740, by 1773, it was in its thirty-sixth edition. The last American edition was published in 1827 in New Haven, Connecticut. The full-page frontispiece portrait of the author was well known to generations of doodling school children and is mentioned in Dickens; in Sketches by Boz. Chapter X there is a humorous description of rowers' togs on the Thames:

They approach in full aquatic costume, with round blue jackets, striped shirts, and caps of all sizes and patterns, from the velvet skull-cap of French manufacture, to the easy head-dress familiar to the students of the old spelling-books, as having, on the authority of the portrait, formed part of the costume of the Reverend Mr. Dilworth.

The other front matter provides an extensive preface, a dedication to the Anglican schools of Great Britain and Ireland, recommendations from educators and a full-page poetic encomium to Dilworth by J. Duick:

What thanks, my friend, should to thy care be given
Which makes the paths to science smooth and even.
Henceforth our youth who tread thy flowery way,
Shall ne'er from rules of proper diction stray;
No more their speech with barbarous terms be filled
No more their pens a crop of nonsense yield.

Dilworth's book plays the part of a paragon in the poem "The Rising Village" by Oliver Goldsmith about the influences of improper education in a Nova Scotia community.

Dilworth also wrote other schoolbooks on arithmetic and bookkeeping.

== Bibliography ==
- New Guide to the English Tongue, facsim. 1978 of 1793 ed. ISBN 0-8201-1322-0
- New Guide to the English Tongue, 1761 12mo."
- Book-Keeper's Assistant 8vo.
- The Schoolmaster's Assistant, Being a Compendium of Arithmetic both Practical and Theoretical 12mo.
- Arithmetic 12mo.
- Compendium of Arithmetic 1752 12mo.
- Critical Dictionary of English Literature... S. A. Allibone, Lippincott, Philadelphia. 1871 (U. Mich. Making of America collection)
- What Jefferson and Lincoln Read by Douglas L. Wilson. The Atlantic, Jan 1991 v267 n1 p51(10)
