= Null move =

In game theory, a null move or pass is a decision by a player to not make a move when it is that player's turn to move. Even though null moves are against the rules of many games, they are often useful to consider when analyzing these games. Examples of this include the analysis of zugzwang (a situation in chess or other games in which a null move, if it were allowed, would be better than any other move), and the null-move heuristic in game tree analysis (a method of pruning game trees involving making a null move and then searching to a lower depth).

The reason a reduced-depth null move is effective in game tree alpha-beta search reduction is that tactical threats tend to show up very quickly, in just one or two moves. If the opponent has no tactical threats revealed by null move search, the position may be good enough to exceed the best result obtainable in another branch of the tree (i.e. "beta"), so that no further search need be done from the current node, and the result from the null move can be returned as the search value. Even if the null move search value doesn't exceed beta, the returned value may set a higher floor on the valuation of the position than the present alpha, so more cutoffs will occur at descendant sibling nodes from the position.

The underlying assumption is that at least some legal move available to the player on move at the node is better than no move at all. In the case of the player on move being in zugzwang, that assumption is false, and the null move result is invalid (in that case, it actually sets a ceiling on the value of the position). Therefore it is necessary to have logic to exclude null moves at nodes in the tree where zugzwang is possible. In chess, zugzwang positions can occur in king and pawn endgames, and sometimes in end games that include other pieces as well.
