= Blockade (disambiguation) =

Blockade is the prevention of troops and supplies from reaching an opposing army.

Blockade may also refer to:

== Entertainment ==
- Blockade (board game), a strategy game by Lakeside
- Blockade (novel), written by Derek Hansen
- Blockade (solitaire), a type of solitaire card game
- Blockade (video game), video game
- Blockade (1928 film), a film by George B. Seitz
- Blockade (1938 film), a film by William Dieterle starring Henry Fonda
- Blockade (film series), a 1973–1977 series of four Soviet World War II feature films about the Siege of Leningrad
- Blockade (2006 film), a documentary film by Sergei Loznitsa
- Blockade (2016 film), a documentary film by Arif Yousuf
- Blockade (Stargate Universe), an episode of the television series Stargate Universe

== Medical ==
- Nerve blockade
- Receptor blockade
- Neuraxial blockade

== See also ==
- The Big Blockade, 1940 British wartime propaganda film
- Blockade Billy, 2010 novel by Stephen King
- Coulomb blockade, in physics
- Operation: Blockade, 2002 video game
- Procaine blockade, medical treatment
- Block (disambiguation)
