= Bodyblock =

Bodyblock or body block may refer to:

- Body block (professional wrestling) or shoulder block, a professional wrestling attack
- Body Block, a historic building in Cleveland, Ohio, US
- Body Blocks Fitness, a health club owned by Bob Bateson in Buffalo, New York, US
- Blocking (American football), one player obstructing another player's path with their body

== See also ==
- Body (disambiguation)
- Block (disambiguation)
- Blocking (disambiguation)
