= Blok =

Blok may refer to:

- Blok (surname) in Holland and Belgium
- Blok (character), DC Comics character
- Blok M, Jakarta, downtown shopping area in Jakarta, Indonesia
- Mega Bloks, plastic building blocks produced by Mega Brands, Canada
- Vlaams Blok (Dutch alias: Vlaams Belang), former Flemish right-wing nationalist political party
- Blok, a company in the fantasy book The Quillan Games by D. J. MacHale
- Bloks, a type of monster in the animated series Code Lyoko (France)
- The Blok, a character in the animated Lego series Nexo Knights
- Blok (avant-garde group), Polish artist collective active in the years 1924-26

== See also ==
- Block (disambiguation)
- Bloch (disambiguation)
