= Blox =

Blox may refer to:

- Blox CMS, a content management system
- John E. Blox (1810–1860), American priest

== See also ==
- Bloc (disambiguation)
- Block (disambiguation)
- Bloch (disambiguation)
- Roblox
