= Blok (surname) =

Blok is a surname of Dutch origin. Dutch blok has similar meanings as English "block" and the name has a variety of origins, including descriptive, metonymic occupational (referring e.g. to a miller or shoemaker), toponymic or even patronymic. The Russian and Polish surnames appear of German and Dutch descent. Notable people with the surname include:

- Alexander Blok (1880–1921), Russian lyrical poet
- Alexander Lvovitch Blok (1852–1909), Russian law professor, father of Alexander Blok
- Anne Martha Blok (born 1998), Dutch para-cyclist
- Anneke Blok (born 1959), Dutch actress
- Anthony Johannes Blok (1868–1934), Dutch jurist and university president
- Anton Blok (1935–2024), Dutch anthropologist
- Arthur Blok (1882–1974), English first administrative head of the Technion – Israel Institute of Technology
- Benjamin Block (1631–1690), German-Hungarian painter, son of Daniel
- Daniel Blok (1580–1660), German painter of Dutch ancestry
- Dick Blok (1925–2019), Dutch scholar of onomastics
- Dieuwertje Blok (1957–2025), Dutch actress, writer, and radio and television presenter
- Ger Blok (1939–2016), Dutch football manager
- Hetty Blok (1920–2012), Dutch cabaret artist, singer, and actress
- Irina Blok (born c.1977), Russian-born American graphic designer and artist
- Ivan Blok (1858–1906), Russian governor of Samara, uncle of Alexander Blok
- Johanna Blok (1650–1715), Dutch silhouette cutter, painter, drawer, etc.
- Josine Blok (born 1953), Dutch classical scholar
- Liubov' Blok (1881–1939), Russian artist and historian, wife of Alexander Blok, daughter of Dmitri Mendeleev
- Peter Blok (born 1960), Dutch stage, television, film and voice actor
- Petrus Johannes Blok (1855–1929), Dutch historian
- Stanisław Blok (1916–1994), Polish fighter ace in World War II
- Stef Blok (born 1964), Dutch politician (VVD)
- Tom de Blok (born 1996), Dutch baseball pitcher
- Vladimir Blok (1932–1996), Russian musicologist, composer and orchestrator
- Willem Johannes "Wim" Blok (1947–2003), Dutch logician
- Willy Blok Hanson (1914–2012), Javanese-born Canadian dancer and choreographer

== See also ==
- Block (disambiguation)#People with the surname
