= The Block =

The Block may refer to:

== Places ==
- The Block (Asheville), the black business district in Asheville, North Carolina
- The Block (Baltimore), an adult entertainment area
- The Block (Philippines), an annex building in SM City North EDSA located in Quezon City
- The Block (Sydney), a street block in Redfern, a suburb of Sydney
- The Outlets at Orange, formerly known as the Block at Orange, a mall in Southern California
- Ish-Blloku (Tirana), upmarket area in Albania known as "The Block"

== Entertainment ==
- The Block (album), a 2008 album from the New Kids On The Block
- A set of TV series of similar format:
  - The Block (Australian TV series)
  - The Block (UK TV series)
  - The Block NZ
  - The Block (Israeli TV series)
  - Het Blok
- WUAB, a TV station in Lorain, Ohio, known as My43 The Block
- WFBC-FM HD2, a radio station in Greenville, South Carolina, known as The Block

== Sports ==
- The Block (American Football), Jerry Kramer's block in the 1967 NFL Championship Game that led to the winning touchdown
- The Block (basketball), LeBron James' block of an Andre Iguodala shot in Game 7 of the 2016 NBA Finals

== Other ==
- The Block (Brack), a 1954 artwork by Australian painter John Brack
- Bloc Québécois, a Canadian political party often referred to as "The Bloc"

== See also ==
- Block (disambiguation)
- The Blok, a character in Nexo Knights
