= Blocker =

Blocker may also refer to:

== Computing ==
- Ad blocker, software for removing or altering online advertising
- Microphone blocker, a connector used to trigger a phone to disconnect its microphone

== Medicine ==
- Antiandrogens, also known as testosterone blockers, a class of drugs that suppress the actions of androgens
- Receptor antagonist, sometimes called a blocker, in medicine a type of receptor ligand or drug that blocks or dampens a biological response

== Sports ==
- Blocker (cricket), slang for a defensive-minded batsman in cricket
- Blocker (ice hockey)
- Blocker, a position in roller derby
- Blocker, a position in volleyball
- Blocker (beach volleyball), a position in beach volleyball
- Steve Roach (rugby league) (born 1962), Australian rugby league footballer nicknamed "Blocker"

== Arts, media and entertainment ==
- Blocker (G.I. Joe), a fictional character in the G.I. Joe universe
- Blockers (film), a 2018 film
- Blockers, a 2026 non-fiction book by Michael Lewis

== Other uses ==
- Blocker (surname)
- Blocker, Oklahoma, an unincorporated community
- Blocker corporation, a type of C Corporation in the US

== See also ==
- Block (disambiguation)
