= Real property =

Legal term; property consisting of land and the buildings on it

In English common law, real property, real estate, immovable property or realty, refers to parcels of land and any associated structures which are the property of a person, group or party. For a structure (also called an improvement or fixture) to be considered part of the real property, it must be integrated with or affixed to the land. This includes crops, buildings, machinery, wells, dams, ponds, mines, canals, and roads. The term is historic, arising from the now-discontinued form of action, which distinguished between real property disputes and personal property disputes. Personal property, or personalty, was, and continues to be, all property that is not real property.

In countries with personal ownership of real property, civil law protects the status of real property in real-estate markets, where estate agents work in the market of buying and selling real estate. Scottish civil law calls real property heritable property, and in French-based law, it is called immobilier ("immovable property").

== Historical background ==
The word "real" derives from Latin res ("thing"). Under European civil law, a lawsuit that seeks official recognition of a property right is known as an actio in rem (action in relation to a thing). This contrasts with an actio in personam in which the plaintiff seeks relief for the actions of a particular person. The distinction can be subtle; the medieval action of novel disseisin, although aimed at repossessing land, was not an actio in rem because it claimed dispossession without leave rather than rightful possession.

Henry de Bracton's Treatise on the Laws and Customs of England is credited with giving "real property" its particular meaning in English law. After discussing the distinction in civil law, Bracton proposed that actions for movable property were inherently actions for relief, and that therefore an actio in rem could be brought only upon immovable property. This view is not accepted in continental civil law, but can be understood in the context of legal developments during Bracton's lifetime. In thirteenth-century England the courts of canon law claimed broad authority to interpret wills, but inheritance of land remained a matter for the royal courts. Laws governing the conveyance of land and that of movable personal property then developed along different paths.

In modern legal systems derived from English common law, the classification of property as real or personal may vary somewhat according to jurisdiction or, even within jurisdictions, according to purpose, as in defining whether and how the property may be taxed. Houseboats, for example, occupy a grey area between personal and real property, and may be treated as either according to jurisdiction or circumstance. Bethell (1998) contains much information on the historical evolution of real property and property rights.

== Characteristics of real property ==
=== Immobility ===
Real property is immobile. Owners cannot move their land to a better location, such as another city, for sale. Thus the fixed location of a parcel of land directly affects, and is a major determinant of, its value.

However, products of the land, such as minerals and crops, can be transported.

=== Externalities ===
Changes that take place nearby will directly affect the real property's value. Real property is vulnerable to externalities due to its immobile nature. External factors outside of the real property will affect the value of the real property, for example, the noises that neighbouring people and construction sites produce.

=== Development ===
A location of desired resources will draw attention to the location. Natural locational attractions include water supply, climate, soil fertility, waterfrontage, and mineral deposits. As the area develops revolving around such natural resources, these developments become components to look for when determining land use and real property values. The surrounding development and proximity, such as markets and transportation routes, will also determine the value of the real property.

=== Supply of urban land ===
Although the overall amount of land (in terms of its surface area) is fixed, the supply of specifically urban land may vary. Sometimes urban land is created from previously agricultural land. Usually urban land is more valuable than agricultural land; this creates the incentive to convert non-urban land to urban land. The value of the land is directly associated with its use. Zoning regulations regarding multi-story development are modified to intensify the use of cities, instead of occupying more physical space.

== Identification of real property ==
To be of any value, a claim to any property must be accompanied by a verifiable and legal property description. Such a description usually makes use of natural or man-made boundaries such as seacoasts, rivers, streams, the crests of ridges, lakeshores, highways, roads, and railway tracks or purpose-built markers such as cairns, surveyor's posts, iron pins or pipes, concrete monuments, fences, official government surveying marks (such as ones affixed by the National Geodetic Survey), and so forth. In many cases, a description refers to one or more lots on a plat, a map of property boundaries kept in public records.

These legal descriptions are usually described in two different ways – metes and bounds, and lot and block. A third way is the Public Land Survey System, as used in the United States.

- Metes. The term "metes" refers to a boundary defined by the measurement of each straight run, specified by a distance between the terminal points, and orientation or direction. A direction may be a simple compass bearing (magnetic), or a more precise orientation determined by accurate survey methods.
- Bounds. The term "bounds" refers to a more general boundary description, the abuttals and boundaries, such as along a certain watercourse, a stone wall, an adjoining public roadway, an adjoining property owner, or an existing building. The system is often used to define larger pieces of property (e.g. farms), and political subdivisions (e.g. town boundaries) where the precise definition is not required or would be far too expensive, or previously designated boundaries can be incorporated into the description.
- The lot and block system is perhaps the simplest of the three main survey systems to understand. For a legal description in the lot and block system a description must identify:
  - the individual lot,
  - the block in which the lot is located, if applicable,
  - a reference to a platted subdivision or a phase thereof,
  - a reference to find the cited plat map (i.e., a page or volume number), and
  - a description of the map's place of official recording (e.g., recorded in the files of the County Engineer).
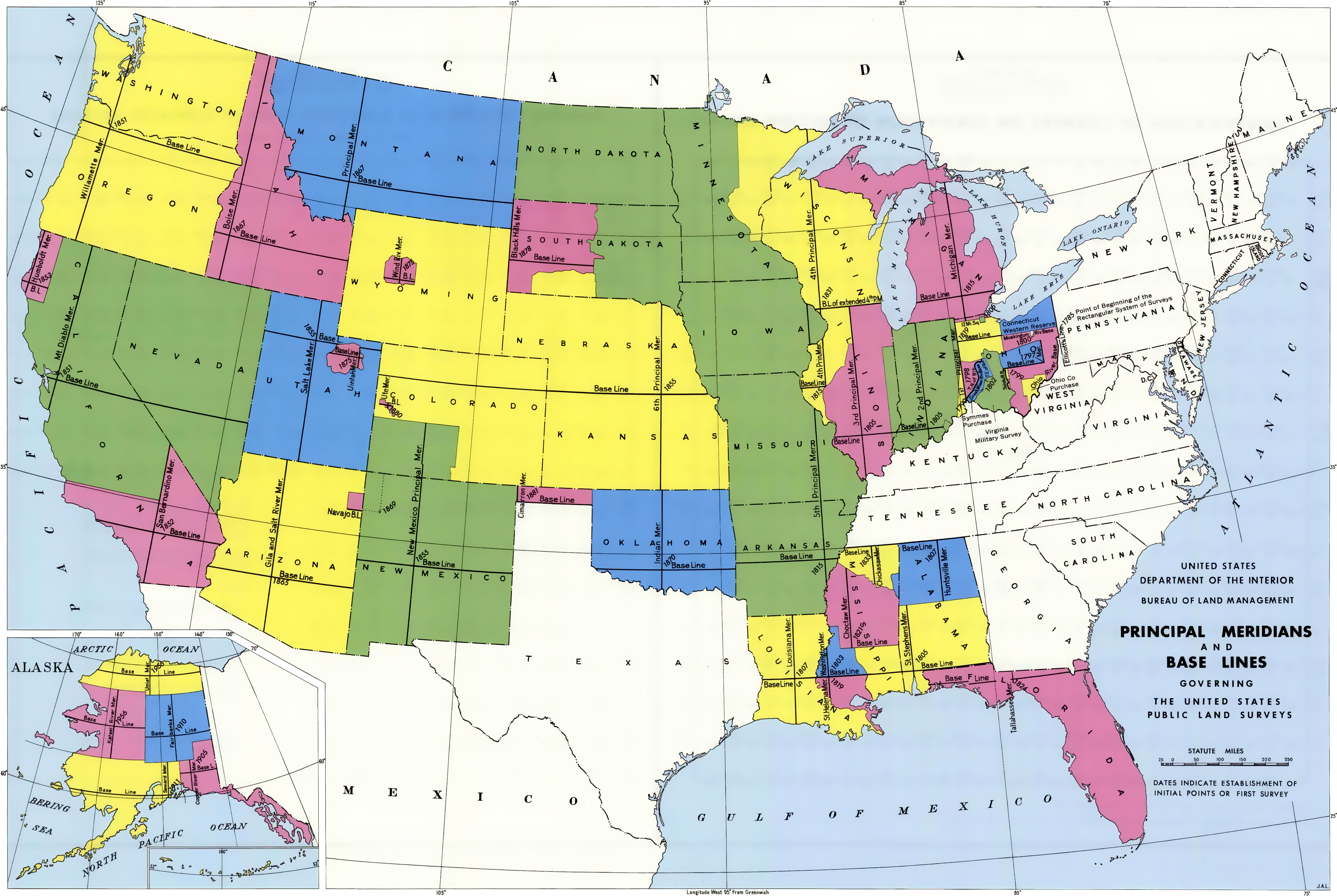
- Principal meridians and Baselines governing the United States Public Land Survey System
  The Public Land Survey System (PLSS) is the surveying method developed and used in the United States to divide real property for sale and settling. The PLSS used nominally rectangular shapes to divide. The basic unit in the PLSS is the Section of land, typically 1-mile square. A 6 x 6-mile grid of sections of landform is what is referred to as a Township. Townships are laid out east and west of a Principal meridian, and north and south of a Baseline.

== Estates and ownership interests defined ==
The law recognizes different sorts of interests called estates, in real property. The type of estate is usually determined by the language of the deed, lease, bill of sale, will, land grant, etc., through which the estate was acquired. Estates are distinguished by the varying property rights that vest in each and determine the duration and transferability of the various estates. A party enjoying an estate is called a "tenant".

Some important types of estates in the land include:

- Fee simple: An estate of indefinite duration that can be freely transferred. The most common and perhaps most absolute type of estate, under which the tenant enjoys the greatest discretion over the disposal of the property.
- Fee simple conditional: An estate lasting forever as long as one or more conditions stipulated by the deed's grantor does not occur. If such a condition does occur, the property reverts to the grantor, or a remainder interest is passed on to a third party.
- Fee tail: An estate which, upon the death of the tenant, is transferred to his or her heirs.
- Life estate: An estate lasting for the natural life of the grantee, called a "life tenant". If a life estate can be sold, a sale does not change its duration, which is limited by the natural life of the original grantee.
- A life estate per autre vie is held by one person for the natural life of another person. Such an estate may arise if the original life tenant sells her life estate to another, or if the life estate is originally granted per autre vie.
- Leasehold: An estate of limited term, as set out in a contract, called a lease, between the party granted the leasehold, called the lessee, and another party, called the lessor, having a longer estate in the property. For example, an apartment-dweller with a one-year lease has a leasehold estate in her apartment. Lessees typically agree to pay a stated rent to the lessor. Though a leasehold relates to real property, the leasehold interest is historically classified as personal property.

A tenant enjoying an undivided estate in some property after the termination of some estate of limited term is said to have a "future interest". Two important types of future interests are:

- Reversion: A reversion arises when a tenant grants an estate of a lesser maximum term than his own. Ownership of the land returns to the original tenant when the grantee's estate expires. The original tenant's future interest is a reversion.
- Remainder: A remainder arises when a tenant with a fee simple grants someone a life estate or conditional fee simple, and specifies a third party to whom the land goes when the life estate ends or the condition occurs. The third party is said to have a remainder. The third-party may have a legal right to limit the life tenant's use of the land.

Estates may be held jointly as joint tenants with rights of survivorship or as tenants in common. The difference between these two types of joint ownership of an estate in land is basically the inheritability of the estate and the shares of interest that each tenant owns.

In a joint tenancy with rights of survivorship deed or JTWROS, the death of one tenant means that the surviving tenants become the sole owners of the estate. Nothing passes to the heirs of the deceased tenant. In some jurisdictions, the specific words "with right of survivorship" must be used, or the tenancy will assume to be tenants in common without rights of survivorship. The co-owners always take a JTWROS deed in equal shares, so each tenant must own an equal share of the property regardless of any contribution to the purchase price. If the property is someday sold or subdivided, the proceeds must be distributed equally with no credits given for any excess that any one co-owner may have contributed to purchase the property.

The death of a co-owner of tenants in common (TIC) deed will have a heritable portion of the estate in proportion to his ownership interest which is presumed to be equal among all tenants unless otherwise stated in the transfer deed. However, if TIC property is sold or subdivided, in some States, Provinces, etc., a credit can be automatically made for unequal contributions to the purchase price (unlike a partition of a JTWROS deed).

Real property may be owned jointly with several tenants, through devices such as the condominium, housing cooperative, and building cooperative.

=== Bundle of rights ===
Property consists of what has been referred to as a "bundle of rights" or a "bundle of sticks." The most important "sticks" in the bundle are: the right to transfer, the right to exclude, the right to use, and the right to destroy.

==== The right to transfer ====
Also called alienability, the right to transfer means that the owner may freely transfer or alienate his property to anyone. The scope of this right may be limited for public policy reasons; who can transfer, what can be transferred, and how property may be transferred may be regulated. For example, an insane person may neither transfer nor obtain real property; certain types of property may not be transferred at all, while some can be given away but not sold; how property is transferred can be regulated to avoid fraud, uncertainty, or other legal problems.

==== The right to exclude ====
An owner has a right to exclude any other person from his property. This has been described by the U.S. Supreme Court "as one of the most essential sticks" in the bundle. In general, the owner of a tract of land may prevent anyone else from entering upon it. This right is enforced by the tort of trespass. Some exceptions apply: for example, a farm owner in New Jersey employed several migrant workers who lived on the property during the harvest season. The Supreme Court of New Jersey held that the owner was not entitled to exclude social services and legal counsel from entering the property to provide service to the migrant workers residing on the property.

==== The right to use ====
Historically, a landowner had the absolute right to use his property in any way he wished, as long as he did not harm the rights of others. This concept is embodied in the Latin maxim sic utere tuo ut alienum non-laedas, which broadly translates to: use your own property in a manner that does not injure another person's property. As a general rule, a landowner is entitled to use their land as they see fit. The scope of this right is limited in some aspects. For example, an owner may not build a "spite fence" that substantially affects the use of the neighbor's land (e.g. a hotel owner built a wall 85 ft (26 metres) long and 18 ft (5.5 metres) high that blocked the windows of a neighboring hotel owner).

==== The right to destroy ====
It is inevitable that most property will eventually be destroyed. A termite-infested house that has outlived its useful life may be demolished to build a new one. However, the scope of this right can be limited. For example, most jurisdictions may not allow an owner to destroy something of substantial value, like a new mansion. In one case, a homeowner directed the executor of her estate to destroy her historic home after her death. The Missouri court held that it would violate public policy to allow the destruction of the home.

=== Other ownership types ===
- Allodial title: Real property that is independent of any superior landlord. Allodium is "Land held absolutely in one's own right, and not of any lord or superior; land not subject to feudal duties or burdens. An estate held by absolute ownership, without recognizing any superior to whom any duty is due on account thereof."

== Jurisdictional peculiarities ==
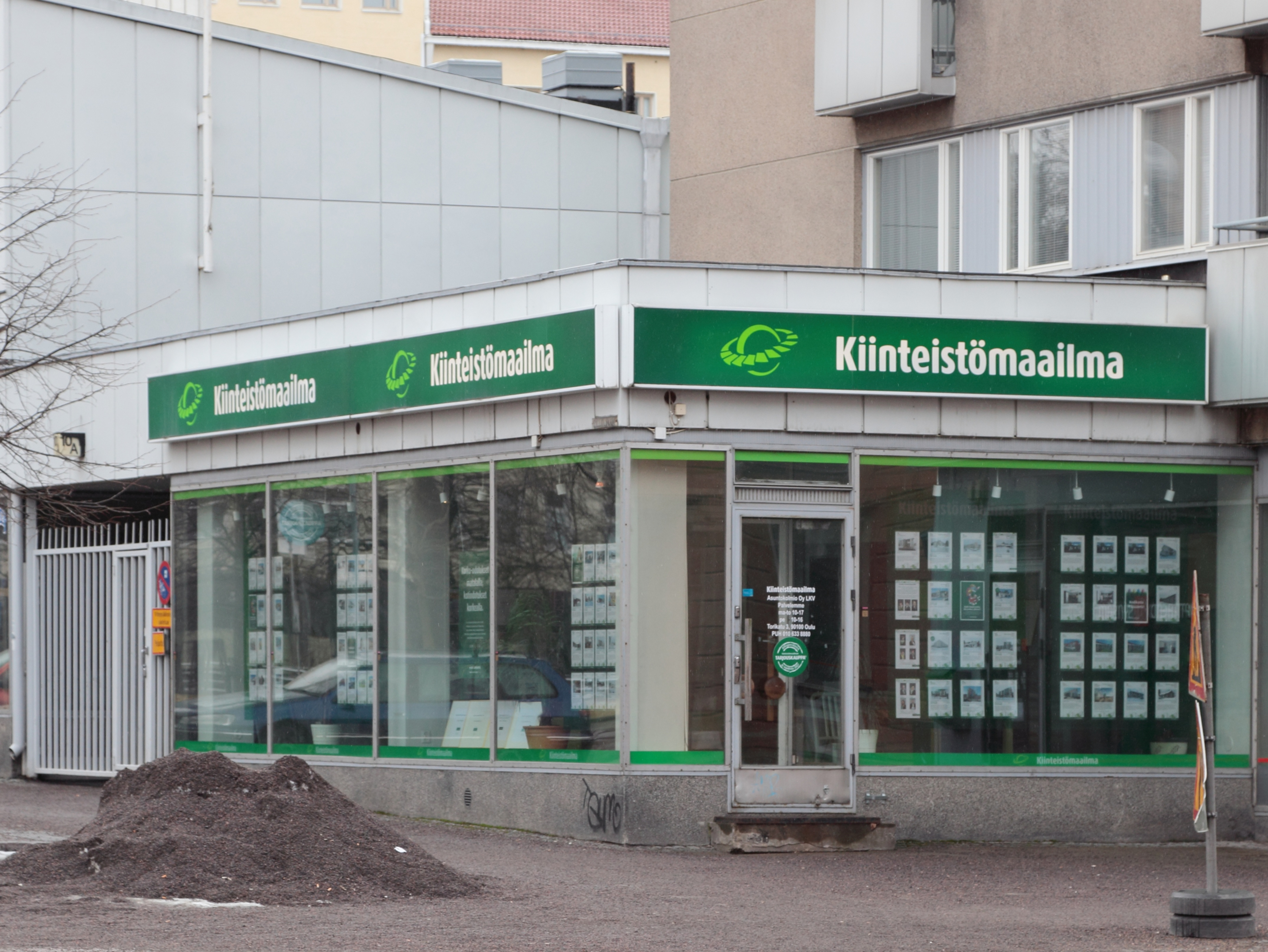
Office of the Kiinteistömaailma real estate agency in Oulu, Finland

In the law of almost every country, the state is the ultimate owner of all land under its jurisdiction, because it is the sovereign, or supreme lawmaking authority. Physical and corporate persons do not have allodial title; they do not own land but only enjoy estates in the land.

=== Australia and New Zealand ===
In many countries, the Torrens title system of real estate ownership is managed and guaranteed by the government and replaces cumbersome tracing of ownership. The Torrens title system operates on the principle of "title by registration" (i.e. the indefeasibility of a registered interest) rather than "registration of title". The system does away with the need for a chain of title (i.e. tracing title through a series of documents) and does away with the conveyancing costs of such searches. The State guarantees title and is usually supported by a compensation scheme for those who lose their title due to the State's operation. It has been in practice in all Australian states and New Zealand since between 1858 and 1875, has more recently been extended to strata title, and has been adopted by many states, provinces and countries, and in modified form in 9 states of the US.

=== United Kingdom ===
In the United Kingdom, the Crown is held to be the ultimate owner of all real property in the realm. This fact is material when, for example, the property has been disclaimed by its erstwhile owner, in which case the law of escheat applies. In some other jurisdictions (not including the United States), real property is held absolutely.

==== England and Wales ====
English law has retained the common law distinction between real property and personal property, whereas the civil law distinguishes between "movable" and "immovable" property. In English law, real property is not confined to the ownership of property and the buildings sited thereon – often referred to as "land". Real property also includes many legal relationships between individuals or owners of the land that are purely conceptual. One such relationship is the easement, where the owner of one property has the right to pass over a neighboring property. Another is the various "incorporeal hereditaments", such as profits-à-Prendre, where an individual may have the right to take crops from land that is part of another's estate.

English law retains several forms of property that are largely unknown in other common law jurisdictions such as the advowson, chancel repair liability and lordships of the manor. In the early common law, these are all classified as real property, as they would have been protected by real actions.

=== United States ===
Each U.S. State except Louisiana has its own laws governing real property and the estates therein, grounded in the common law. In Arizona, real property is generally defined as land and the things permanently attached to the land. Things that are permanently attached to the land, which also can be referred to as improvements, include homes, garages, and buildings. Manufactured homes can obtain an affidavit of affixture.

== Economic aspects of real property ==
Land use, land valuation, and the determination of the incomes of landowners are among the oldest questions in economic theory. Land is an essential input (a factor of production) for agriculture, and agriculture is by far the most important economic activity in pre-industrial societies. With the advent of industrialization, important new uses for land emerged as sites for factories, warehouses, offices, and urban agglomerations. The value of the real property, taking the form of man-made structures and machinery, generally decreases relative to the value of the land alone. Where industrial, agricultural, and commercial property values depreciate as a result of contamination, extraction, and expected wear and tear, respectively, residential property value depreciation is mitigated by more frequent and affordable maintenance and improvements.

Starting in the 1960s, as part of the emerging field of law and economics, economists and legal scholars began to study the property rights enjoyed by tenants under the various estates and the economic benefits and costs of the various estates. This resulted in a much-improved understanding of the:

- Property rights enjoyed by tenants under the various estates. These include the right to:
  - Decide how a piece of real property is used;
  - Exclude others from enjoying the property;
  - Transfer (alienate) some or all of these rights to others on mutually agreeable terms;
- Nature and consequences of transaction costs when changing and transferring estates.

For an introduction to the economic analysis of property law, see Shavell (2004), and Cooter and Ulen (2003). For a collection of related scholarly articles, see Epstein (2007). Ellickson (1993) broadens the economic analysis of real property with a variety of facts drawn from history and ethnography.

== See also ==
- Benefice
- Fiefdom
- Land ownership in Canada
- Land tenure
- Landlord
- Mesne assignment
- Mineral rights
- Property Management
- Real estate
- The Land Report
