= Blockbusting (disambiguation) =

Blockbusting is an unethical business practice used in the United States real estate market.

Blockbusting may also refer to:

- Blockbusting (game), a combinatorial game in which players occupy cells on a $1 \times n$ strip
- Popils, a video game known in Europe as Popils The Blockbusting Challenge

== See also ==
- Blockbuster (disambiguation)
