= Block number =

Block number may refer to:

== Aviation ==
- United States Department of Defense aerospace vehicle designation, for general US military usage
- 1962 United States Tri-Service aircraft designation system, for the 1960s/Cold War era US military term

== Built environment ==
- City block and House numbering, for general urban planning usage
- Census block and Census block group, for the US Census terminology
- Lot and block survey system, for the North American survey term
- Community development block, for the Indian development term
- Borough, Block and Lot, for New York City planning usage

== Computing ==
- Logical block addressing, for the data storage term
- Block cipher, for cryptographic usage
- Spreadsheet cells, for spreadsheet usage

== Other ==
- Call blocking, for general telephone usage
- Telephone number pooling, for the US Telephone Numbering Plan term
- Numberblocks, for the BBC television series
