= Blockbuster =

Blockbuster may refer to:

== Corporations ==
- Blockbuster (retailer), a former video rental chain
- Last Blockbuster, remaining store

== Arts and entertainment ==
=== Film and television ===
- Blockbuster (entertainment), a very successful movie
- Blockbuster (2018 film), a 2018 Netflix film
- Block Busters, a 1944 American comedy film
- Blockbuster (TV series), a 2022 Netflix series
- AEW Summer Blockbuster, a 2025 All Elite Wrestling television special
- Blockbusters (American game show)
  - Blockbusters (Australian game show)
  - Blockbusters (British game show)
- "Block Buster", an episode of the sitcom The King of Queens

=== Literature ===
- Blockbuster (book), a 2004 book by Tom Shone
- Blockbuster (DC Comics), four characters
- Blockbuster (Man-Brute), a Marvel Comics character
- Blockbuster (Marauder), a Marvel Comics character

=== Music ===
- Blockbuster (album), by Block B, 2012
- "Block Buster!", a 1973 song by Sweet
- "Blockbuster", a song by Enhypen and YEONJUN from the 2021 album Dimension: Dilemma
- "BlockBuster", a 2019 song by Dongkiz
- "Blockbuster", a 1989 song by The Jesus Lizard on Pure
- "Blockbuster", a song by Neil Cicierega from Mouth Moods

=== Others ===
- Blockbuster (party game), a 2019 cooperative party game
- Block Buster (Microvision), a 1979 video game
- Blockbuster (podcast), 2019
- Somersault neckbreaker or blockbuster, a wrestling move

== Military ==
- Blockbuster bomb, large aerial bomb
- "Operation Blockbuster", Netherlands, World War II

== Other ==
- Blockbuster drug, any $1b/year medication
- Splitting maul, or block buster, a type of axe

== See also ==
- Blockbusta, a 2023 album by Busta Rhymes
- Blockbuster Pavilion (disambiguation)
- Block (disambiguation)
- Blockbusting (disambiguation)
