= Overheating =

Overheating may refer to:

- Overheating (economics), a rapid, very big growth of production that is thought to have a negative influence
- Overheating (electricity), unexpected rise of temperature in a portion of electrical circuit, that can cause harm to the circuit, and accidents
- Overheating (combinatorial game theory), an operation on combinatorial games that approximately reverses the effect of chilling
- Hyperthermia, also called sunstroke, an elevated body temperature due to failed thermoregulation
- Thermal shock, the overheating of a device leading to reduced efficiency, damage or even destruction

== See also ==
- "Overheated", a song by Billie Eilish from the studio album Happier Than Ever (2021)
