= Blocking =

Blocking may refer to:

== Science, technology, and mathematics ==
=== Computing and telecommunications ===
- Blacklist (computing)
- Blocking (computing), holding up a task until an event occurs
- Blocking (radio), interference by an off-frequency signal
- Blocking probability, for calls in a telecommunications system
- Head-of-line blocking, in some network switching fabrics
- Internet blocking; see Block (Internet)

=== Psychology ===
- Thought blocking, a type of thought disorder
- Blocking effect, in psychology
- Mental block, a type of suppression or repression

=== Other uses in science ===
- Blocking (linguistics), where the existence of a competing form blocks the application of a morphological process
- Blocking (statistics), in the design of experiments, the arranging of experimental units in groups (blocks) which are similar to one another
- Atmospheric blocking, a phenomenon in meteorology of large scale stationary pressure cells
- Blocking, in the western blot technique, a process to prevent unwanted binding of antibodies to a membrane

=== Other technologies ===
- Blocking (construction), short boards used as reinforcement or to provide attachment points in wood-framed and other forms of construction

== Sport ==
- Blocking (American football), the legal interference with another player's motion
- Blocking (martial arts), a defensive technique in martial arts

== Theatre and film ==
- Blocking (stage), the movement and positioning of actors on a stage, or within a frame in film
- Blocking (animation), a technique in which key poses establish timing and placement of items in a scene

== Other uses ==
- Blocking (textile arts), the process of stretching a knitted garment into shape while wet or using steam
- Blocking (transport), the process of dividing a transit schedule into parts that can be operated by a single vehicle
- Blocking troops - military barrier troops positioned to forestall unauthorised retreats

== See also ==
- Block (disambiguation)
- Non-blocking (disambiguation)
