= Bloque =

Bloque may refer to:

- "Bloqué", a song by French hip hop duo Casseurs Flowters, 2013
- Bloque, (es) a Spanish band 1973–2000, which played Sfinks Festival in 1999
- Bloque, a Colombian band signed to Luaka Bop

== See also ==
- Bloc (disambiguation)
