= Goodrich–Kirtland Park =

Neighborhood of Cleveland, Ohio, United States

- Neighborhood of Cleveland
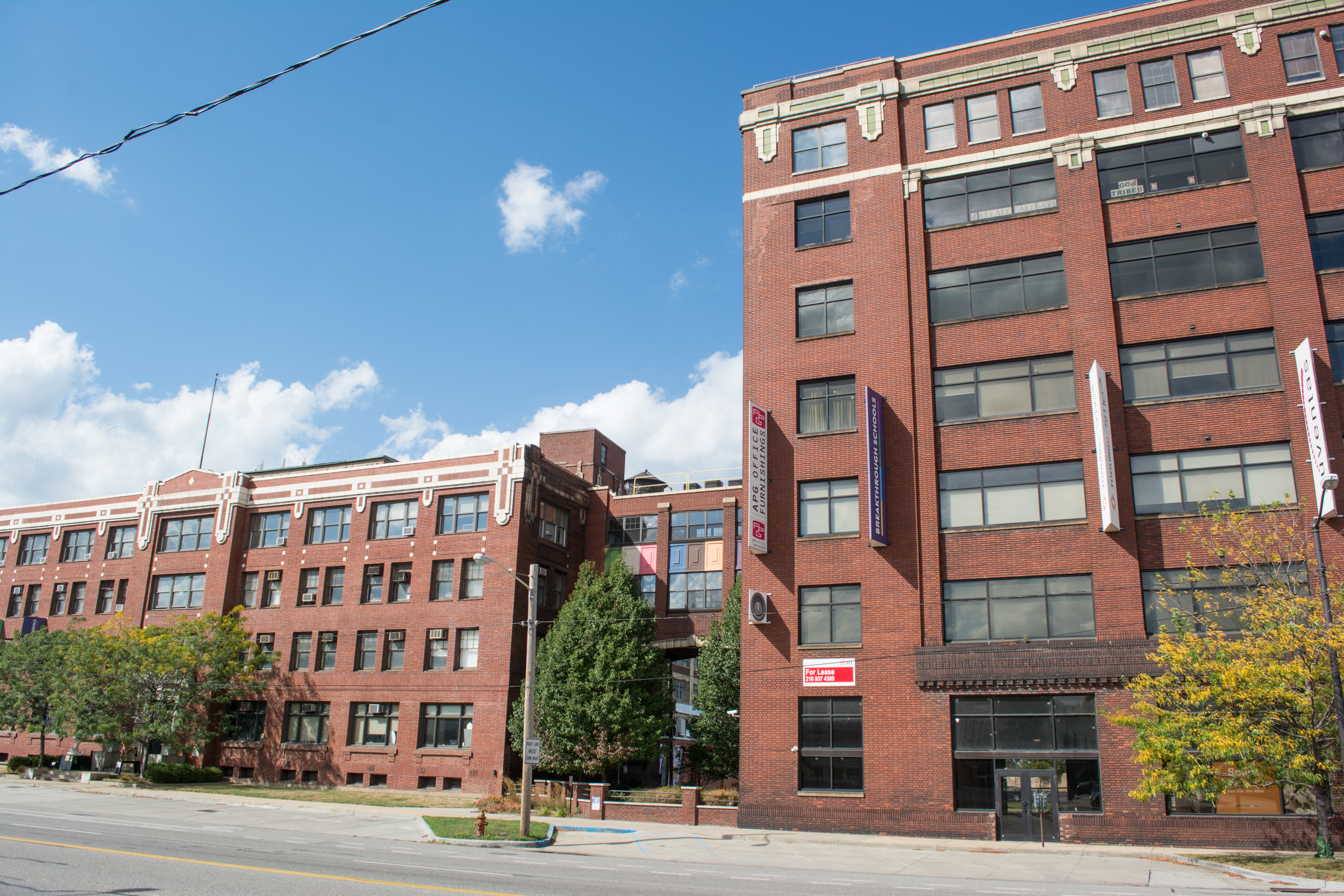
- Tyler Village complex

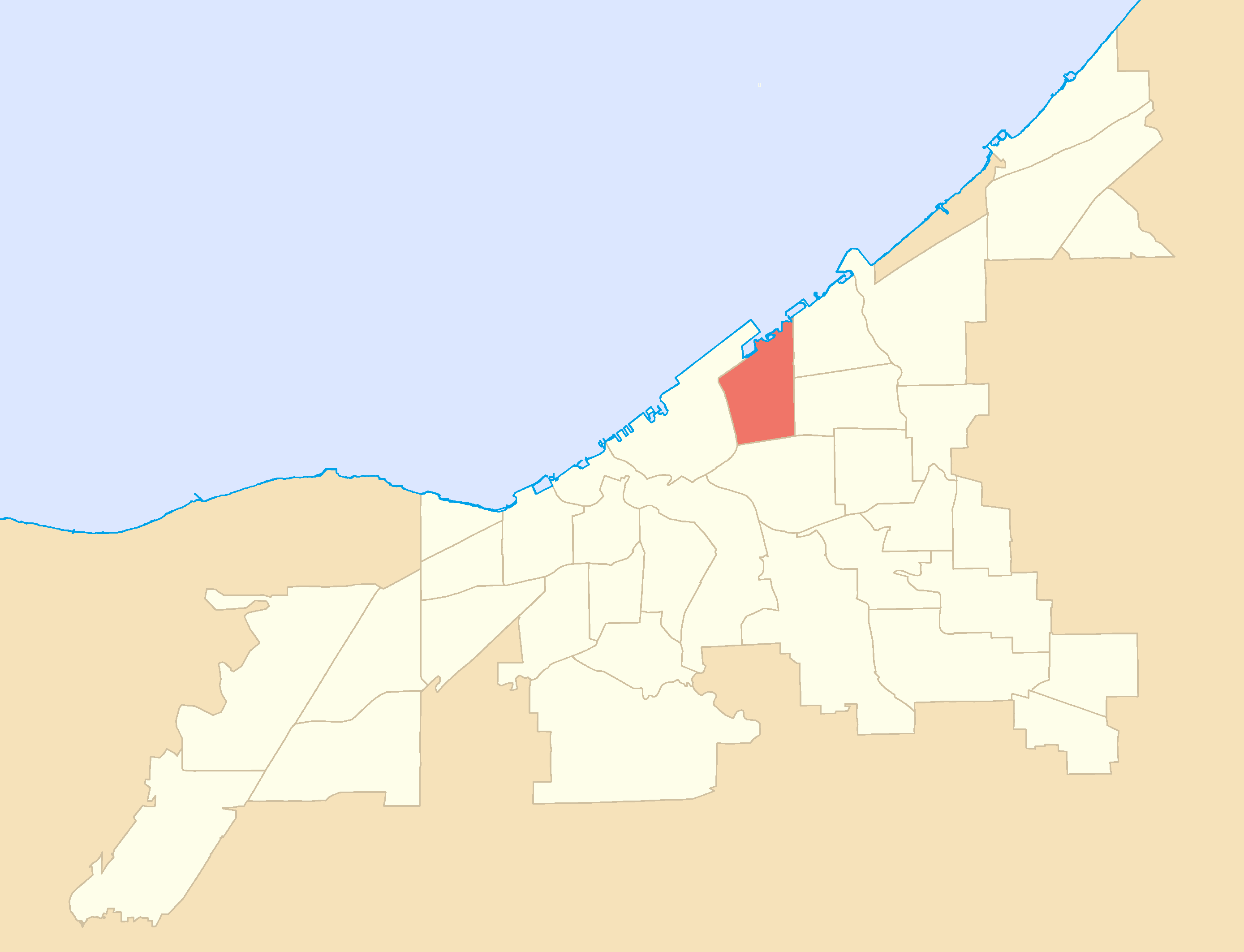
- Coordinates: 41°30′45″N 81°39′47″W
- Country: United States
- State: Ohio
- County: Cuyahoga County
- City: Cleveland

Population (2010)
  - Total: 4,103

Demographics
  - White: 35.1%
  - Black: 21.8%
  - Hispanic (of any race): 10.8%
  - Asian and Pacific Islander: 30.8%
  - Mixed and Other: 1.6%
- Time zone: UTC-5 (EST)
  - Summer (DST): UTC-4 (EDT)
- ZIP Codes: 44103, 44114
- Area code: 216
- Median income: $25,509
- Source: 2010 U.S. Census, NEO CANDO

Goodrich–Kirtland Park is a neighborhood on the East Side of Cleveland, Ohio. Roughly bounded between Euclid Avenue to the south, E. 55th Street to the east, I-90 to the west, and Lake Erie and Burke Lakefront Airport to the north.

To most locals, the area is most known as Asiatown.

The neighborhood is home to the Ohio Technical College, located at E. 51st Street and St. Clair Avenue.

== Points of interest ==
- Body Block (4925-4955 Payne Avenue and 1692-1696 E. 55th Street)
- Children's Museum of Cleveland (3813 Euclid Avenue)
- Ohio Technical College (1269, 1374 East 51st Street)
