= Lot and block survey system =

Land system in the United States and Canada

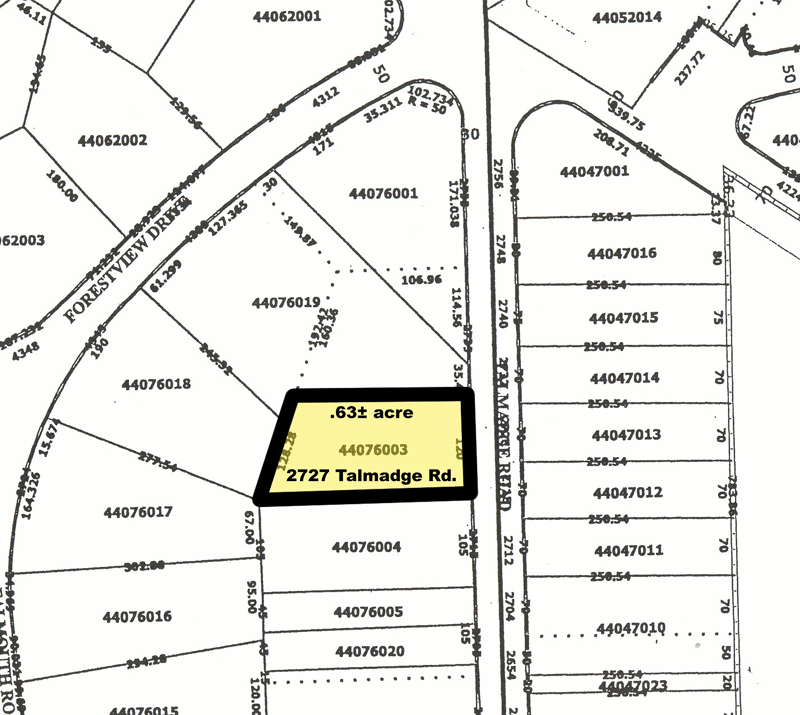
A contemporary plat map used in the lot and block system.

The lot and block survey system is a method used in the United States and Canada to locate and identify land, particularly for lots in densely populated metropolitan areas, suburban areas and exurbs. It is sometimes referred to as the recorded plat survey system or the recorded map survey system.

== Origins of the system ==
The system is the most recent of the three main survey systems. It began to be widely employed in the United States in the 19th century when cities began to expand into the surrounding farmland. The owners of a large tract of land would create a plat and subdivide the tract into a series of smaller lots to be sold to buyers. This subdivision survey plan would then be recorded with an official government record keeper. The officially recorded map then became the legal description of all the lots in the subdivision. The method became widespread after the post World War II expansion into the suburbs when formerly rural areas became heavily populated and large tracts of rural land were divided into smaller lots.

== Mechanics ==
The system begins with a large tract of land. This large tract is typically defined by one of the earlier survey systems such as metes and bounds or the Public Land Survey System. A subdivision survey is conducted to divide the original tract into smaller lots and a plat map is created. Usually this subdivision survey employs a metes and bounds system to delineate individual lots within the main tract. Each lot on the plat map is assigned an identifier, usually a number or letter. The plat map is then officially recorded with a government entity such as a city engineer or a recorder of deeds. This plan becomes the legal description of all the lots in the subdivision. A mere reference to the individual lot and the map's place of record is all that is required for a proper legal description.

== Other uses ==
A type of the Lot and Block system is frequently used for tax identification purposes in the United States. This designation, often called a Tax Identification Number or Tax Parcel Number, is not directly based on the legal description of the property.

The system can be used even if the property is not legally described by the Block and Lot system. A property legally described by a metes and bounds description may still be assigned a Tax Identification Number based on a separate Lot and Block system. In this case, a survey of all parcels in the county or municipality would be combined to create a separate Block and Lot system to identify the properties for taxation purposes. For example, a metes and bounds described parcel may be assigned the Tax Identification Number 14-55-118, which has nothing to do with the legal description of the property recorded in the deed other than its use to create the tax Block and Lot maps. In this case, the first number may be used to indicate the local municipality, the second number indicates the tax map on which the property is recorded, and the third number is the parcel identification number on the indicated map. A similar system might be Tax Identification Number 205-K-33 where "205" is the map book volume number, "K" is the individual map, and "33" is a parcel number.

== See also ==
- Borough, Block and Lot (New York City)
