= The Block (Brack) =

Painting by John Brack

- Artist: John Brack
- Year: 1954
- Medium: oil on canvas
- Dimensions: 59.0 cm × 71.5 cm (23.2 in × 28.1 in)
- Location: National Gallery of Victoria, Melbourne

The Block is a 1954 painting by Australian artist John Brack. The painting depicts the interior of an empty butcher's shop, including the eponymous butcher's block. It is one of a series of paintings—including The Barber's Shop (1952), The Fish Shop (1955) and Men's Wear (1955)—of small high street businesses.

The tools of the trade – choppers, knives and meathooks – hang from the rails. The butcher’s block, centrally placed and painted in a darker tone, dominates the composition. Despite the rather grisly subject matter, Brack has achieved a small, perfectly contained and beautifully painted jewel-like interior. The detail of the brushwork, with its meticulous lines and opaque passages of thin paint in the background, the fine scratches incised into the block to indicate its use, and the artist’s handmade wooden frame, all converge in an exquisite synthesis

— Geoffrey Smith,

Brack's works, including The Block, were often considered to be satire of 1950s and 60s Australia. However, Helen Maudsley (Brack's wife) claims that Brack intended the work to be a commentary on the Holocaust.

Everyone hooted with laughter when they saw it," she says. "We were horrified - it's another kind of butcher's shop. The Holocaust then was something people couldn't bear to acknowledge - it was like planes hitting towers today.

— Helen Maudsley,

The painting was first exhibited in February 1954 at the Peter Bray Gallery in Melbourne. It was purchased by Colonel Aubrey Gibson, later a trustee of the National Gallery of Victoria (NGV). It was exhibited at the NGV in 1969 as part of the Aubrey Gibson collection. It was later included in two John Brack retrospective exhibitions—at the NGV in 1987 and at the National Gallery of Australia in Canberra in 1999.

The work was acquired by the National Gallery of Victoria, through the Art Foundation of Victoria by Dr Joseph Brown, in 1999.
