= Gauntlet (Stargate Universe) =

- Stargate Universe episode
- Eli looking out over the stars
- Episode no.: Season 2 Episode 20
- Directed by: Andy Mikita
- Written by: Joseph Mallozzi & Paul Mullie
- Original air date: May 9, 2011

Guest appearances
- Julia Benson as Vanessa James; Peter Kelamis as Adam Brody; Jennifer Spence as Lisa Park; Patrick Gilmore as Dr. Dale Volker; Jeffrey Bowyer-Chapman as Darren Becker; Mike Dopud as Varro; Leanne Adachi as Cpl. Barnes; Lou Diamond Phillips as David Telford; Vincent Gale as Morrison; Sarah Smyth as Annie Balic

Episode chronology
← Previous "Blockade"	Next → —

"Gauntlet" is the twentieth episode of the second season and series finale of the military science fiction television series Stargate Universe. The episode originally aired on May 9, 2011 on Syfy in the United States. The episode was directed by longtime director and producer of the Stargate franchise Andy Mikita. It was written by executive producers Joseph Mallozzi and Paul Mullie.

The drones are now monitoring every Stargate, from Destiny's position to the edge of the galaxy, instead of just the stars. With their main supply line blocked, the crew destroys a Command Ship to resupply but takes considerable damage in the process. Realizing they cannot continue fighting, Eli (David Blue) comes up with an idea to put Destiny in one continuous FTL jump until they reach the next galaxy. This journey will take at least three years and the crew are to use the stasis chambers aboard to keep themselves alive.

This episode represented the final foray into the Stargate franchise until Stargate Origins in 2018.

== Plot ==
As Lisa Park is still recovering from T.J.'s treatment to try to restore her vision, Dr. Rush and Eli inform Colonel Young that they have been able to improve Destiny's sensors, but show that Command Ships await them at every Stargate from where they are to the edge of the galaxy, rendering themselves unable to obtain supplies. Young reports this to Colonel Telford on Earth, but unfortunately, the only known Stargate capable of reaching Destiny remains in control of the Langarans who refuse to allow for its use.

Dr. Rush proposes a means of tuning the shields to improve their efficiency against the Control ship drone attacks; they use this maneuver to gain time while they try to resupply on a nearby planet through the Stargate while resisting the Control ship attack. The drones, finding their weapons ineffective, begin to perform kamikaze attacks on Destiny, causing minor damage. On return to faster-than-light speed, the crew agree that while the idea worked, they would not survive too many more attacks given ever-accumulating damage.

Eli offers the idea of keeping the Destiny in FTL and travel through the rest of the galaxy and the void beyond as to reach Stargates in the next galaxy. The plan would require the crew to use the recently discovered stasis pods as to reduce draw down of life support on the ship's power supply as well as to extend their meager supplies. Though there is a risk the ship would drop out of FTL before then, stranding them on what would then be a thousand-year journey, they all agree they have a better chance at survival than facing the Command ships.

While the science team program Destiny's course and revival systems, the other crew are each given the opportunity to use the communication stones to return to Earth and say their goodbyes to loved ones before being placed in stasis. Eventually, all but Col. Young, Dr. Rush, and Eli have been safely placed inside stasis. As they are about to initiate the long jump, they find that one of the last empty pods is not working, and one of the three will have to stay outside; they would be able to sustain life support for two weeks before it would need to be shut off, giving them the opportunity to try to fix the last chamber in that time. Dr. Rush offers to be the one, but Col. Young confides in Eli that he would not trust Dr. Rush to do what is right if he cannot fix the chamber, and believes he should stay. Eli refuses to accept this, having been in Dr. Rush's shadow since they arrived on Destiny, and believes he would have the best chance of survival as he is smarter than Dr. Rush. Col. Young accepts the decision, and Eli helps to put them in stasis. As power to the rest of the ship is shut down, Eli goes to the observation deck and silently watches the passing starscape.

== Development ==
Prior to the script being written, the original pitch called for Colonel Young and Dr. Rush to be the last two people remaining with only one working stasis pod. The decision about who would be left out was decided by a coin flip, but the result would remain unknown to the audience, essentially setting up the season three premiere. The pitch for the season three premiere had Dr. Rush maintaining Destiny's systems in his solitude until Earth eventually found a way to dial the ship. This would then only prove to be a dream that Dr. Rush has whilst he is in stasis, as Colonel Young is revealed to be the one left out. However, because of the lack of action, the "it was all a dream" scenario, and Dr. Rush's character development, it was deemed unusable and, therefore, the original season two finale pitch would not work either.

Joseph Mallozzi had the task of writing the first draft for "Gauntlet." At the time, Mallozzi was under the impression that the show would continue into a third season, so he wrote the episode as if it were a season finale. The supper scene was originally planned to be only a montage of the crew having their last meal. However, SyFy’s Erika Kennair requested a change, in which after Mallozzi wrote Colonel Young's speech, it was tweaked by Paul Mullie to include a reference of "three years," which alluded to the time it took for Destiny to reach its destination and the show's expected run.

== Reception ==
"Gauntlet" was viewed by 1.134 million live viewers, resulting in a 0.8 Household rating, a 0.2 among adults 18–49.

Meredith Woerner from io9 called the finale "more like a bittersweet goodbye than an action-packed cliffhanger, even though it ended with a much more encouraging conclusion than the first season." She was reminded of the depressing subterfuge of the first season saying that "Perhaps Eli said it best in this episode: What's the point of having tremendous potential if you're not going to step up when you're really needed? Stargate Universe captured despairing exhaustion and glinting hope in a vast chasm of potential... Sadly for everyone, this brilliant story would go untold." However in retrospect, she praised the dynamics between Eli and Dr. Rush remarking that "Even when Rush finally admits to Eli that he's full of potential and gives him the pat on the head he's been shirking the whole series...This wasn't about Eli seeking acceptance, it was about Rush humbling himself for the first time in a long time. The mentor steps down, and Eli takes up the mantle of hero."

Mike Moody from TVSquad declared "Gauntlet" "a strong, densely plotted, emotional hour." He enjoyed the overall theme of the episode, speaking volumes about the characters working as a family, rather than trying to focus on "the search for the God signal that was said to be Destiny's true purpose." Like Woerner, Moody praised the dynamics between Eli and Dr. Rush adding that "These two shared a satisfying scene where the elder scientist finally admitted to the slacker genius that he had tremendous potential." Moody had particular praise for Eli's character development saying that "Leaving the fates of the ship and its crew in Eli's hands felt appropriate...Eli, like many of us at some point in our lives, was faced with the difficult task of believing in himself. He still looked like the videogame-obsessed slacker we met in the pilot, but the heart of a true hero."

Ramsey Isler from IGN remarked that "All things considered, this was as good of a finale as we could expect." Isler had particular praise for the writing expressing that "We should never take for granted how hard it is to come up with plausible scenarios for sci-fi shows...This story works as well as it does because these are all smart ideas, and the creative team deserves credit for all it." Like Moody, Isler also praised Eli saying that "The greatest achievement of SGU is that it told a grand and poignant tale of a wide-eyed, lonely, insecure boy growing into a brilliant man, and leading a life of adventure that few could ever imagine." Isler was also reminded of the many failures that led the show's demise but claimed that "this particular episode showed few flaws, and gave us reasons to recall just how much potential this series had." Overall, Isler said "As sweet as the final moments of this series are, there is a certain bitter aftertaste too."
