= Land lot =

Tract or parcel of land that is owned

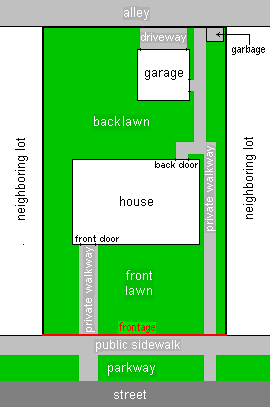
Diagram of an example house plot as seen from above, showing front and back lawns, positions of structures on the plot, and immediate surroundings. The plot boundaries are outlined in black except for the frontage, which is shown in red. In this example, the immediate surroundings include a pavement, parking area, and section of the road out in front and a section of an alley at the back. Plot structures include a house, private walkways, and at the back - a detached garage with a drive access to the alley and a small area for refuse.

In real estate, a land lot or plot of land is a tract or parcel of land owned or meant to be owned by an/some owner(s). A plot is essentially considered a parcel of real property in some countries or immovable property (meaning practically the same thing) in other countries. Possible owners of a plot can be one or more persons or another legal entity, such as a company, corporation, organization, government, or trust. A common form of ownership of a plot is called fee simple in some countries.

A small area of land that is empty except for a paved surface or similar improvement, typically all used for the same purpose or in the same state is also often called a plot. Examples are a paved car park or a cultivated garden plot. This article covers plots (more commonly called lots in some countries) as defined parcels of land meant to be owned as units by an owner or owners.

Like most other types of property, lots or plots owned by private parties are subject to a periodic property tax payable by the owners to local governments such as a county or municipality. These real estate taxes are based on the assessed value of the real property; additional taxes usually apply to transfer of ownership and property sales. Other fees by government are possible for improvements such as curbs and pavements or an impact fee for building a house on a vacant plot. Property owners in the United States and various other countries are also subject to zoning and other restrictions. These restrictions include building height limits, restrictions on architectural style of buildings and other structures, setback laws, etc.

In New Zealand land lots are generally described as sections.

== Definition and boundaries ==
A lot has defined boundaries (or borders) which are documented somewhere, but the boundaries need not be shown on the land itself. Most lots are small enough to be mapped as if they are flat, in spite of the curvature of the Earth. A characteristic of the size of a lot is its area. The area is typically determined as if the land is flat and level, although the terrain of the lot may be hilly and not flat. The contour surface area of the land is changeable and may be too complicated for determining a lot's area.

Lots can come in various sizes and shapes. To be considered a single lot, the land described as the "lot" must be contiguous. Two separate parcels are considered two lots, not one. Often a lot is sized for a single house or other building. Many lots are rectangular in shape, although other shapes are possible as long as the boundaries are well-defined. Methods of determining or documenting the boundaries of lots include metes and bounds, quadrant method, and use of a plat diagram. Use of the metes and bounds method may be compared to drawing a polygon. Metes are points which are like the vertices (corners) of a polygon. Bounds are line segments between two adjacent metes. Bounds are usually straight lines, but can be curved as long as they are clearly defined.

When the boundaries of a lot are not indicated on the lot, a survey of the lot can be made to determine where the boundaries are according to the lot descriptions or plat diagrams. Formal surveys are done by qualified surveyors, who can make a diagram or map of the lot showing boundaries, dimensions, and the locations of any structures such as buildings, etc. Such surveys are also used to determine if there are any encroachments to the lot. Surveyors can sometimes place posts at the metes of a lot.

The part of the boundary of the lot next to a street or road is the frontage. Developers try to provide at least one side of frontage for every lot, so owners can have transport access to their lots. As the name implies, street frontage determines which side of the lot is the front, with the opposite side being the back. If the lot area is known, from the deed, then the frontage line can be calculated as depth by measuring the width (as area divided by width = depth). Sometimes minor, usually unnamed driveways called alleys, usually publicly owned, also provide access to the back of a lot. When alleys are present, garages are often located in back of a lot with access from the alley. Also when there are alleys, garbage collection may take place from the alley. Lots at the corners of a block have two sides of frontage and are called corner lots. Corner lots may have the advantage that a garage can be built with street access from the side, but have the disadvantage that there is more parkway lawn to mow and more pavement to shovel snow from. In areas with large blocks, homes are sometimes built in the center of the block. In this situation, the lot will usually include a long driveway to provide transport access. Because the shape is reminiscent of a flag (the home) on a flag pole (the driveway), these lots are called flag lots.

== Development and use ==
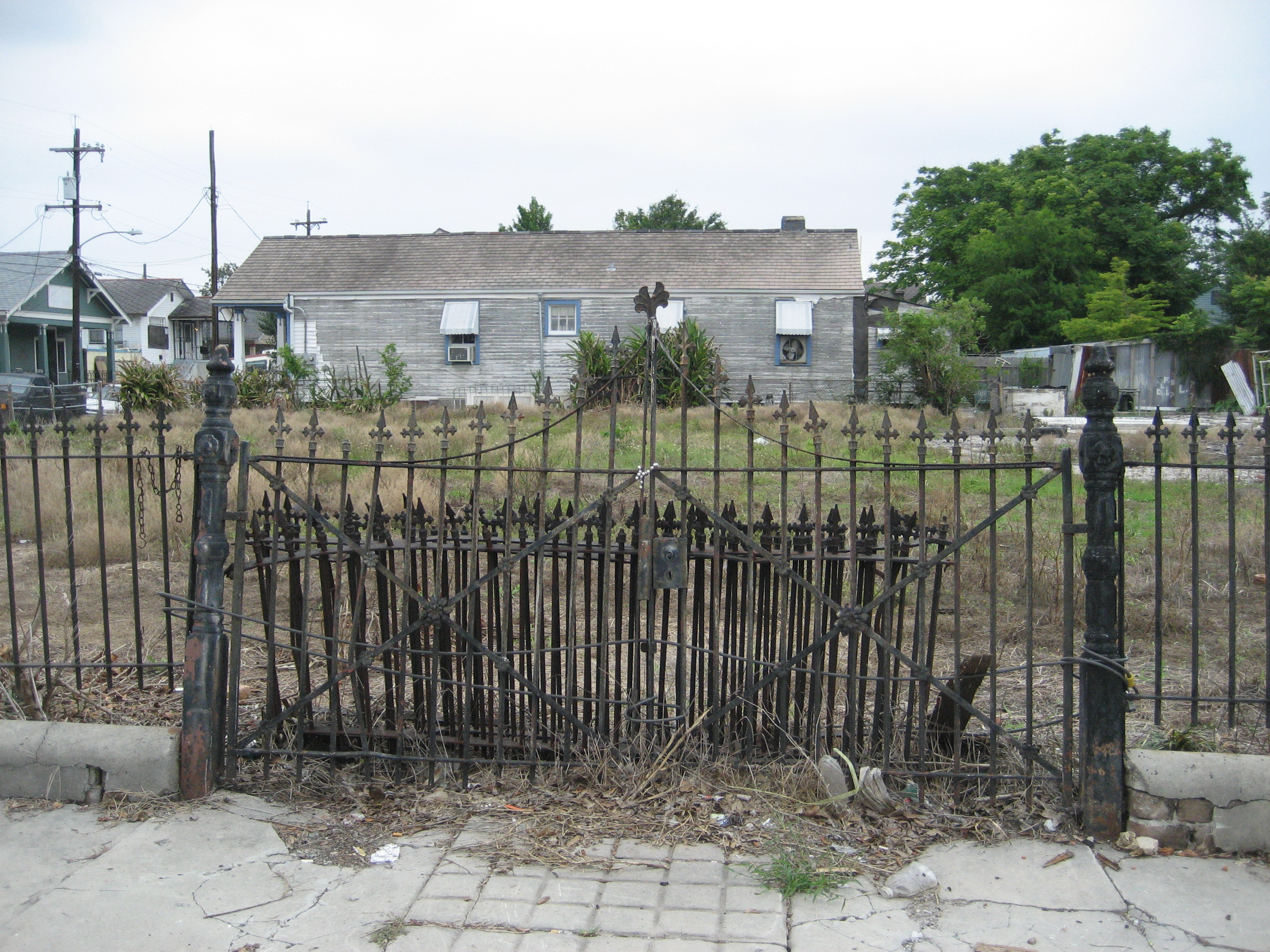
Vacant lot, with fencing

Local governments often pass zoning laws which control what buildings can be built on a lot and what they can be used for. For example, certain areas are zoned for residential buildings such as houses. Other areas can be commercially, agriculturally, or industrially zoned. Sometimes zoning laws establish other restrictions, such as a minimum lot area and/or frontage length for building a house or other building, maximum building size, or minimum setbacks from a lot boundary for building a structure. This is in addition to building codes which must be met. Also, minimum lot sizes and separations must be met when wells and septic systems are used. In urban areas, sewers and water lines often provide service to households. There may also be restrictions based on covenants established by private parties such as the real estate developer. There may be easements for utilities to run water, sewage, electric power, or telephone lines through a lot.

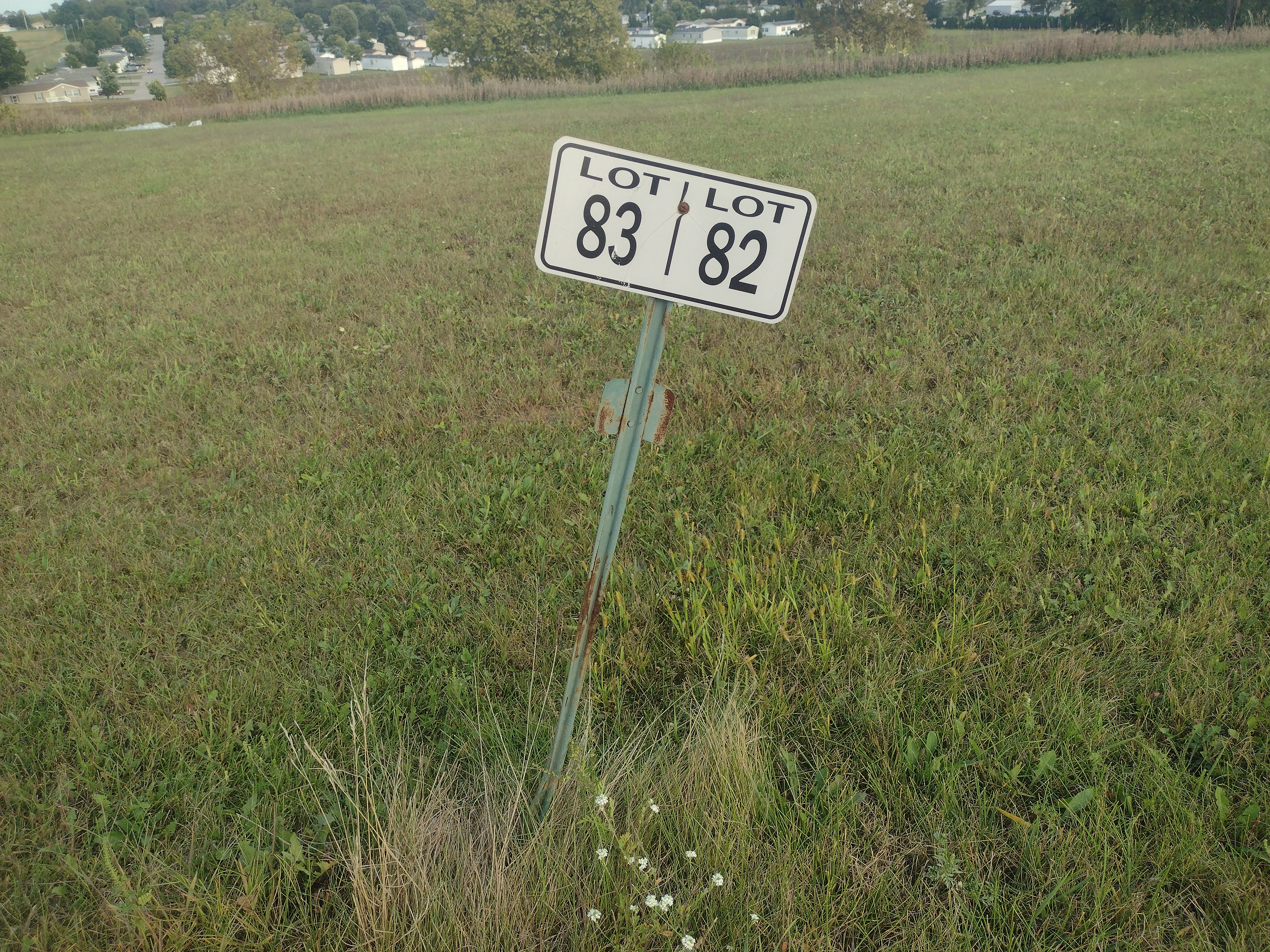
A marker to show the divisions of individual lots within a subdivision.

Something which is meant to improve the value or usefulness of a lot can be called an appurtenance to the lot. Structures such as buildings, driveways, pavements, patios or other surfaces, wells, septic systems, signs, and similar improvements which are considered permanently attached to the land in the lot are considered to be real property, usually part of the lot but often parts of a building, such as condominiums, are owned separately. Such structures owned by the lot owner(s), as well as easements which help the lot owners or users, can be considered appurtenances to the lot. A lot without such structures can be called a vacant lot, urban prairie, spare ground, an empty lot, or an unimproved or undeveloped lot.

Many developers divide a large tract of land into lots as a subdivision. Certain areas of the land are dedicated (given to local government for permanent upkeep) as streets and sometimes alleys for transport and access to lots. Areas between the streets are divided up into lots to be sold to future owners. The layout of the lots is mapped on a plat diagram, which is recorded with the government, typically the county recorder's office. The blocks between streets and the individual lots in each block are given an identifier, usually a number or letter.

Land originally granted by the government was commonly done by documents called land patents. Lots of land can be sold/bought by the owners or conveyed in other ways. Such conveyances are made by documents called deeds which should be recorded by the government, typically the county recorder's office. Deeds specify the lot by including a description such as one determined by the "metes and bounds" or quadrant methods, or referring to a lot number and block number in a recorded plat diagram. Deeds often mention that appurtenances to the lot are included in order to convey any structures and other improvements also.

In front of many lots in urban areas, there are pavements, usually publicly owned. Beyond the pavement, there may sometimes be a strip of land called a road verge, and then the roadway, being the driveable part of the road.

== Examples ==
Queen Street in Toronto was referred to as Lot Street before 1837 as it was used by British surveyors to mark park lots of important land owners in York, Upper Canada.

== See also ==
- Butts and bounds
- Cadastre
- City block
- City planning
- Landlocked parcel
- Site plan
- Stand level modelling
- Zoning
