= Blocky =

Blocky may refer to:

- Blocky, a type of soil structure
- Blocky (ChalkZone), a character from the animated series ChalkZone
- Blocky and Oxwinkle, a pair of characters from the animated series Rugrats
- Blocky, a character from the first season of Battle for Dream Island, an animated web series
- Blocky, a test system run by the website GreatFire

== See also ==
- Block (disambiguation)
- John Blockey (born 1937), British bobsledder
