= Transfer deed =

A transfer deed is a document used in conveyancing in England and Wales to transfer real property from its legal owner to another party.

Sometimes referred to as a transfer and formerly a conveyance or assignment (if a transfer of an existing Leasehold title).

Several different forms of transfer are used, depending on the circumstances of the transaction. For example, a TR1 is used for most cases where the whole of a title is to be transferred, a TR2 is used for most possession sales, and a TP1 for most transfers of part.

HM Land Registry requires that prescribed forms are used for transfer deeds, and these are available from the Registry's website, as well as from law stationers.
