= Asiatown, Cleveland =

Asiatown
- Enclave
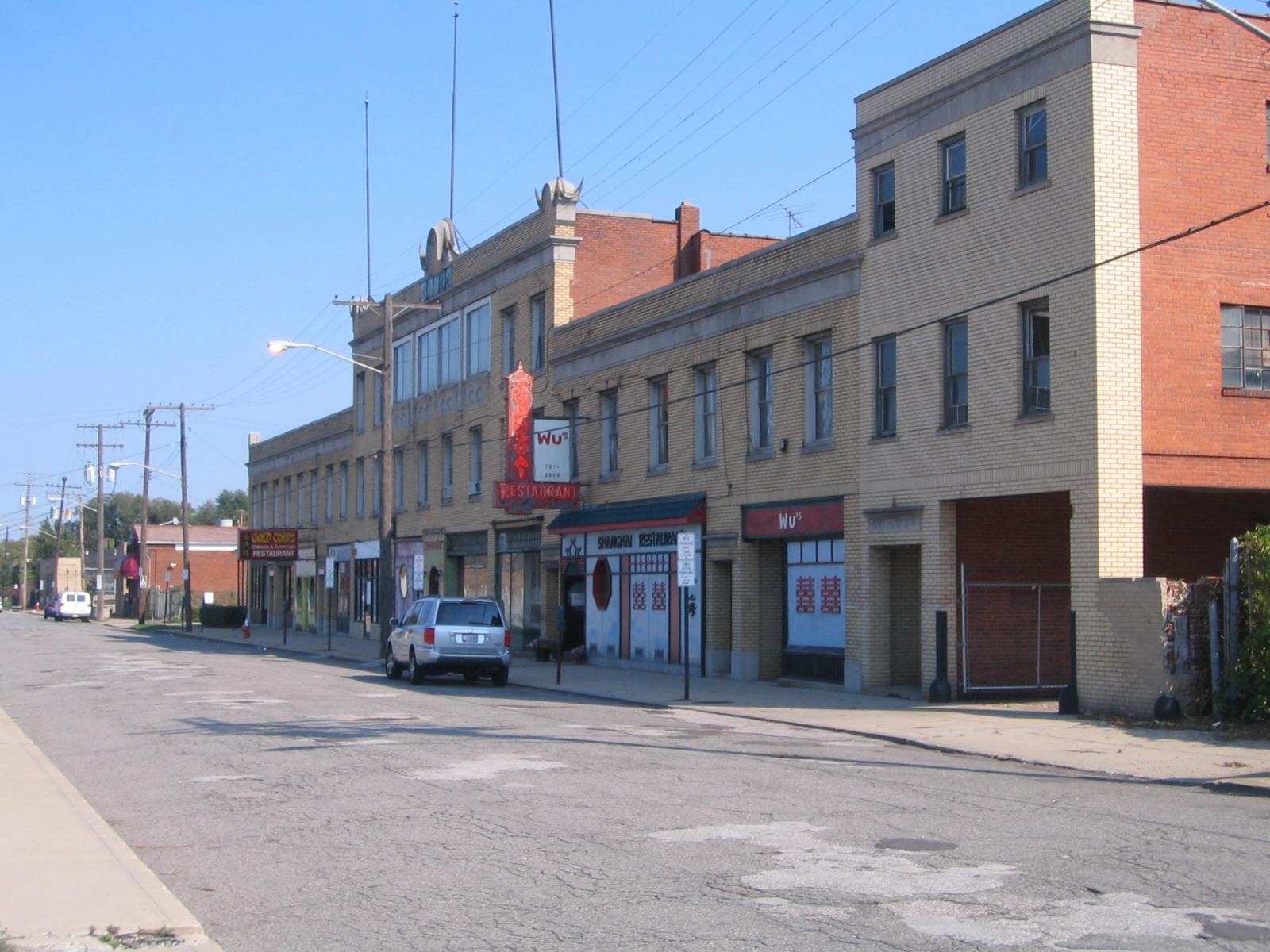
- Historic Chinatown, the 2100 block of Rockwell Avenue in Cleveland
- Interactive map of Asiatown
- Coordinates: 41°30′31.8″N 81°40′49.5″W
- Country: United States
- State: Ohio
- County: Cuyahoga
- City: Cleveland

Population (2011)
  - Total: approximately 1,200

Asiatown, also spelled AsiaTown and formerly known as Chinatown, is a Chinatown located in Cleveland, Ohio, in the United States. Chinese people, brought to the country as railroad workers, established the area in the 1860s. The area became known as Chinatown in the 1920s, and was then centered at Rockwell Avenue and E. 22nd Street. Large numbers of non-Chinese people from Asia settled in the area in the 1960s and 1970s, leading to the enclave's expansion eastward. The expanded enclave was named Asiatown in 2006, with that portion on Rockwell Avenue often being referred to as "Old Chinatown" or "Historic Chinatown".

Asiatown straddles the boundary between the Downtown Cleveland and Goodrich–Kirtland Park neighborhoods.

== Chinatown ==
=== Rise of Chinatown ===
Cleveland's first Asian residents were Chinese, who came to the United States to work on the railroads. These individuals came to Cleveland to escape the racism and anti-Chinese sentiments of white people on the West Coast. Their numbers were initially small, and numbered only 23 in 1880. By 1900, the number had risen to 96. Initially, these Chinese settled on Ontario Street between Lakeside and St. Clair Avenues, north of Public Square, and the enclave consisted of small retail shops like clothing stores, grocery stores, laundries, and restaurants. By the 1890s, however, the enclave was dissolving, with Chinese-run shops scattered throughout the downtown area.

Rapid development of Cleveland's downtown, particularly the Terminal Tower complex (which began construction in 1926), displaced these residents and shops and drove them eastward. By the end of the 1920s, a much larger and more permanent enclave had formed around the intersection of Rockwell Avenue and E. 22nd Street and the name "Chinatown" began to be used in the 1920s to describe the area.

=== Heyday: 1930s to 1960s ===
Cleveland's Chinatown was largely confined to Rockwell Avenue between E. 21st and E. 24th Streets. On Leong Tong, a merchant association, which had begun construction on its new building at 2138–2136 Rockwell Avenue in 1926, formally opened its retail, office, and residential space on January 4, 1931. This two-story structure contained ground-floor retail and restaurant space and second-story office and residential units. The enclave thrived in the 1930s, as popular and now-locally famous restaurants like Shanghai Restaurant (which opened in 1931), Red Dragon Café (which opened in 1932), and Golden Gate (which opened in 1933) drew large numbers of white Americans. Dishes such as chow mein and chop suey, which had taste and texture similar to Western European cooking, were mainstays of these establishments. Most Chinatown restaurants stayed open until 4 A.M. on weekends.

The number of Chinese living in Chinatown rose significantly during the next four decades. A major influx of new Chinese residents occurred in the 1950s, after the conclusion of the Chinese Communist Revolution in 1949. Chinatown remained a popular dining destination throughout the 1940s and 1950s. A new restaurant, the Three Chinese Sisters, opened in 1949 and quickly became a Cleveland dining landmark.

=== Decline ===
Chinatown entered a sharp decline in the 1970s. In part, this was caused by the influx of non-Chinese Asians into the area. Shared cultural values, which encouraged Chinese to support other Chinese businesses and families, broke down as pluralism increased. Another factor was the lessening of racial barriers, which allowed more Asians to obtain a college degree or a better job and leave Chinatown. A final factor was the improved financial condition of second- and third-generation immigrant families, many of whom left downtown for larger homes in the suburbs. Although the very popular Golden Coins restaurant opened in 1976 in the former Rockwell Restaurant building, by 1985 only two businesses (both restaurants) remained in Cleveland's historic Chinatown.

An early 1990 crime wave and the opening of Asia Plaza (a shopping mall catering to Asian businesses and consumers) in nearby Asiatown worsened the economic decline of historic Chinatown. The last Asian restaurant on Rockwell Avenue was Shanghai Wu's Cuisine, which took over the Shanghai Restaurant space in December 2006. It closed in February 2009.

== AsiaTown ==
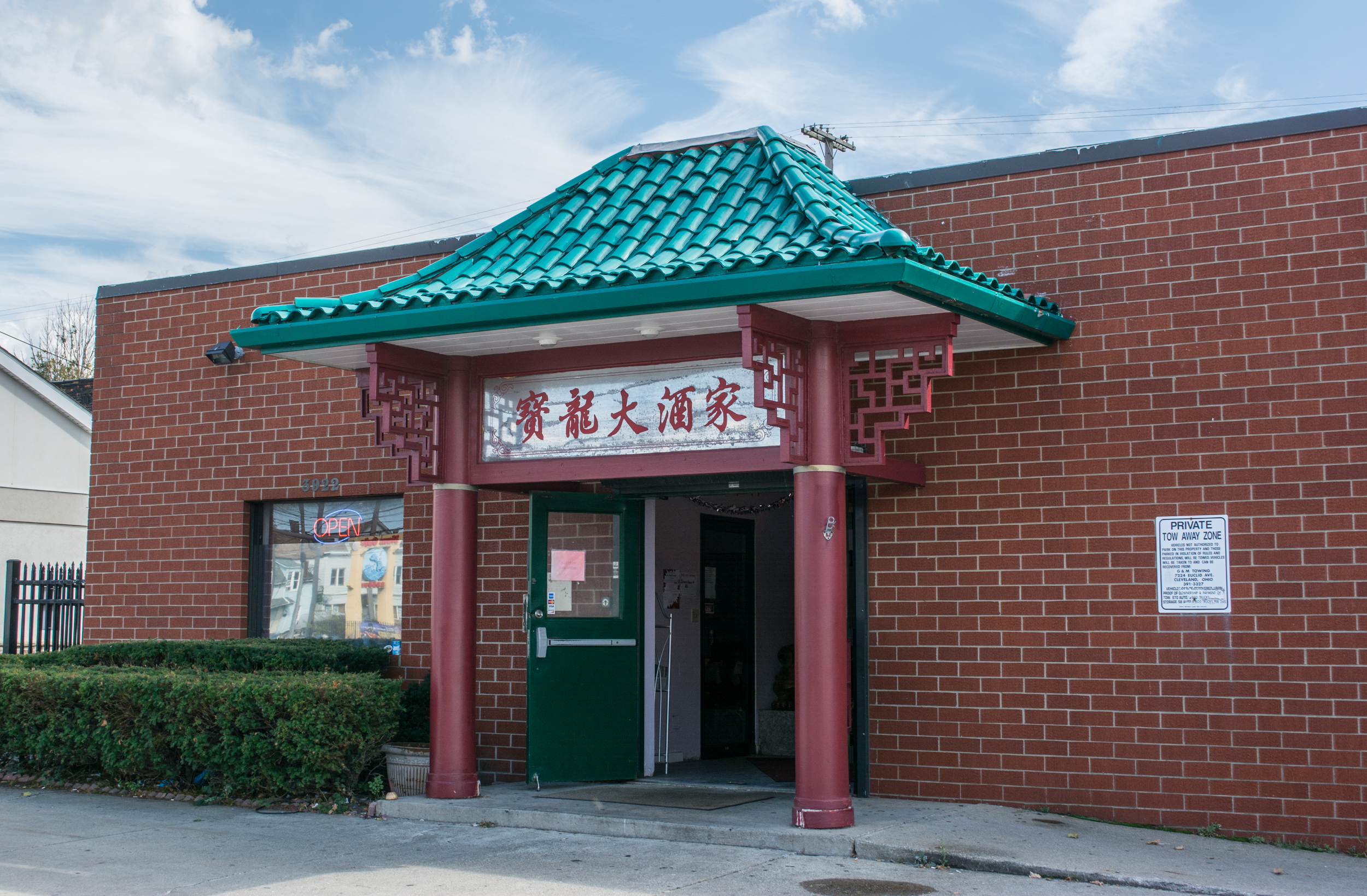
Bo Loong opened in 1986, helping to anchor the new Asiatown.

=== Rise of a "new" Chinatown ===
Cleveland saw a major influx of Koreans from 1960 to 1970, many of whom lived in Chinatown. Significant numbers of Vietnamese took up residence in the enclave from 1980 to 2000. As these and other Asian immigrant groups settled in greater numbers in Cleveland, the Asian enclave began to expand beyond its original boundaries to the east. By the early 1990s, a new enclave had emerged, bounded by St. Clair and Payne Avenues and E. 30th and E. 40th Streets.

In 1986, a Chinese restaurant, Bo Loong, opened in a newly constructed building at 3922 St. Clair Avenue. Attracting both Asian and non-Asian customers, it proved to be a groundbreaking establishment which anchored the emerging Asiatown. In 1991, Asia Plaza opened on the northwest corner of E. 30th Street and Payne Avenue. This modern shopping mall, which featured extensive parking space, not only provided a more comfortable indoor shopping experience for consumers but also drew new diners. It was anchored by Li Wah, the second in a chain of restaurants (all featuring the "Wah" name) which catered to both Asian and non-Asian palates. New Asian grocery stores, stocking items for a wide range of Asian cuisines, also opened.

=== AsiaTown: 2006 to present ===
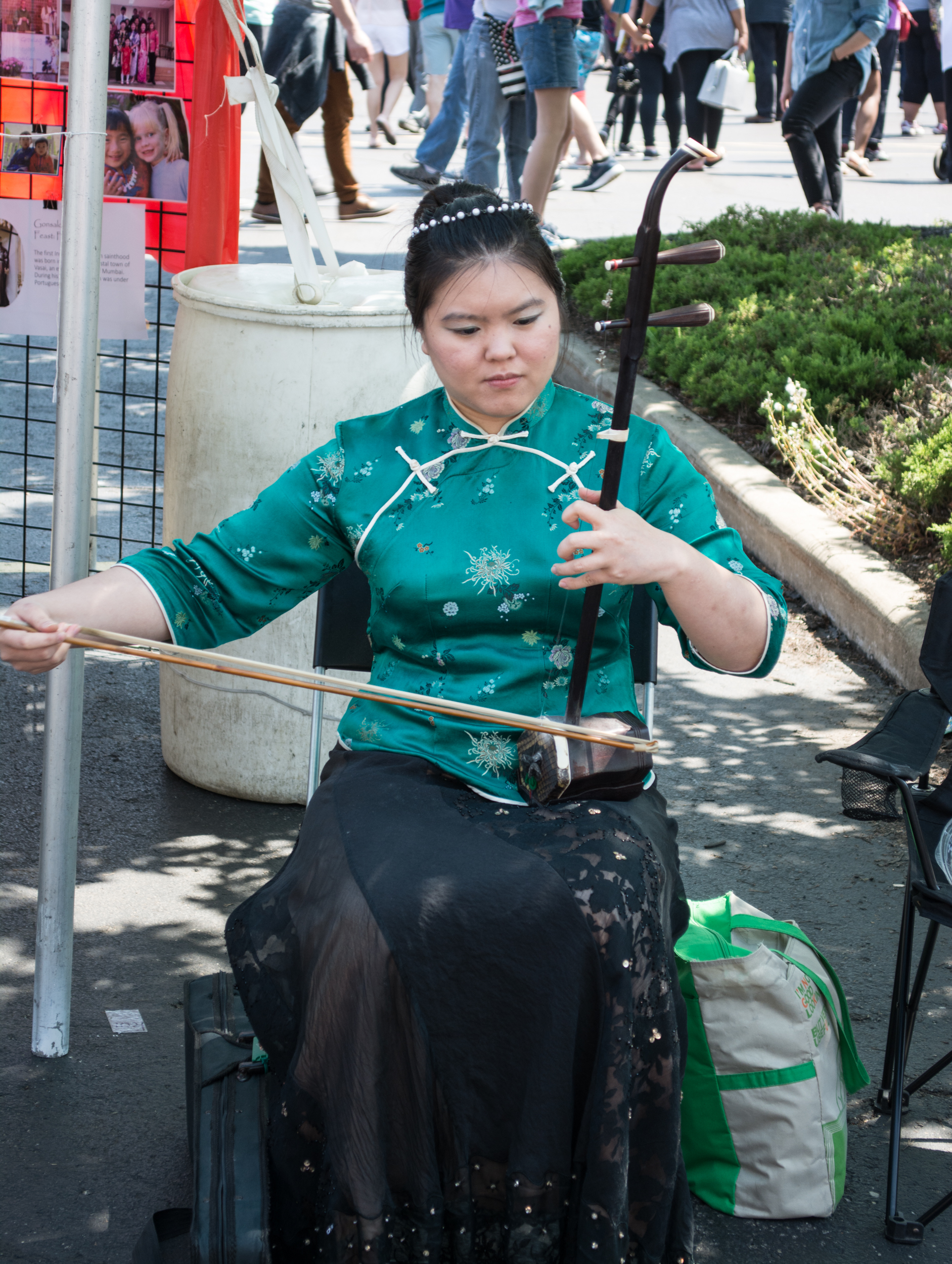
An erhu player, Janice Liu, performs at the 2016 Cleveland Asian Festival.

By 2002, a distinct Asian enclave had emerged in the "new Chinatown". In 2006, merchants and developers began using the term "AsiaTown" to the describe the area, a term which better reflected the cultural diversity of the enclave. The name was formally adopted by local residents and merchants and by the St. Clair-Superior Development Corporation in August 2007.

A second major shopping mall, Asian Town Center, opened in AsiaTown in 2008. Located at Superior Avenue and E. 38th Street, tenants included Korean and Vietnamese restaurants and a large Asian grocery store. The mall also included non-traditional businesses, such a dance studio, homeopathic medicine "pharmacy", martial arts studio, and the Negative Space Gallery. The art gallery, which opened in 2010, featured artist workspaces, a performance area, coffee bar, and exhibition space.

AsiaTown stakeholders inaugurated the Cleveland Asian Festival in 2010 co-founded by Lisa Wong, Vi Huynh and Johnny K. Wu. The one-day festival drew more than 10,000 people its first year., bringing economic growth to the neighborhood as well as the pioneer event that helped inspiring other events such as Cleveland Flea Market and Night Market. The following year, the festival had expanded to two days and drew more than 45,000 people making it one of Cleveland's most popular spring events. The revitalization of the enclave led to a major renovation of the historic Chinatown Building on Rockwell Avenue in 2011.

In 2015, St. Clair Superior Development Corporation inaugurated the first of the Night Market events. Held on Rockwell Avenue and designed to help bring life to Chinatown, the Night Market (held during evening hours once a month in the summer) featured live music, dance performances, and the sale of alcoholic beverages, art, food, and soft drinks. The first few Night Markets attracted only a few hundred people, but by 2016 some nights had more than 4,000 people patronize the event. In 2018, Night Market took a year break due to lack of funding and support.

== Boundaries ==
The name of the enclave is spelled both "Asiatown" and "AsiaTown".

Asiatown consists of two sections. That portion known as "Historic Chinatown" or "Old Chinatown" runs on either side of Rockwell Avenue between E. 21st and E. 24th Streets. The remainder of Asiatown is bounded by E. 30th and E. 40th Streets between St. Clair and Perkins Avenues.

The population of Asiatown was approximately 1,200 in 2011.

== Bibliography ==
- Dutka, Alan F. (2014). AsiaTown Cleveland: From Tong Wars to Dim Sum. Charleston, S.C.: The History Press. ISBN 9781626195523.
- Fugita, Stephen (1977). Asian Americans and Their Communities of Cleveland (Report). Cleveland: Cleveland State University.
- Williams, Ashley M. (2007). "Chinese". In Sisson, Richard; Zacher, Christian; Cayton, Andrew (eds.). The American Midwest: An Interpretive Encyclopedia. Bloomington, Ind.: Indiana University Press. ISBN 9780253348869.
