= Borough, Block and Lot =

Land surveying system in New York City

Borough, Block, and Lot (also called Borough/Block/Lot or BBL) is the parcel number system used to identify each unit of real estate in New York City for numerous city purposes.

== Administration ==
The BBL system is administered by the New York City Department of Finance and serves as the primary identifier for property tax assessment, ownership records, and zoning information across all five boroughs. Each BBL is linked to the Automated City Register Information System (ACRIS), which provides public access to recorded property documents including deeds, mortgages, and liens. The system is also used by the New York City Department of Buildings to track permits, violations, and certificate of occupancy records tied to specific parcels.

As mandated by Local Law 11, the last digit of the block number is used to determine the facade inspection deadline, if the building is more than six storeys.

When two parcels of land are combined, one of the BBLs continues to be used actively and the other does not. However, older records may still reference the deactivated number. Additionally, condominiums often have one billing BBL for the entire property and a separate BBL for each unit.

== Formatting ==
A BBL consists of three numbers, separated by slashes: the borough, which is 1 digit; the block number, which is 5 digits; and the lot number, which is 4 digits. Block and lot numbers are padded with leading zeros as needed to reach the required digit length; as a result, a BBL is always exactly ten characters.

The borough number is:

1. Manhattan (New York County)
2. Bronx (Bronx County)
3. Brooklyn (Kings County)
4. Queens (Queens County)
5. Staten Island (Richmond County)

An example of a valid style of BBL is 4/99999/9999 or 4 99999 9999 for Queens.

== See also ==
- Lot and Block survey system
- Texas land survey system
