= Bloc =

Bloc may refer to:

== Government and politics ==
- Political bloc, a coalition of political parties
- Trade bloc, a type of intergovernmental agreement
- Voting bloc, a group of voters voting together
- Black bloc, a tactic used by protesters who wear black clothing to conceal identities by making it difficult to distinguish between participants

== Other uses ==
- Bloc (code school), an educational website
- Bloc Hotels, a British hotel chain
- A Frenchism for bouldering, a sport

== See also ==
- Block (disambiguation)
- Bloc Party, a band
- Bloc party, a political party that is a constituent member of an electoral bloc
- Bloc Québécois, a political party in Canada
- Block voting, or bloc voting, types of electoral systems
- Eastern Bloc, a former group of communist states during the Cold War
- Western Bloc, countries aligned with the United States during the Cold War
