= Body Block =

- U.S. National Register of Historic Places
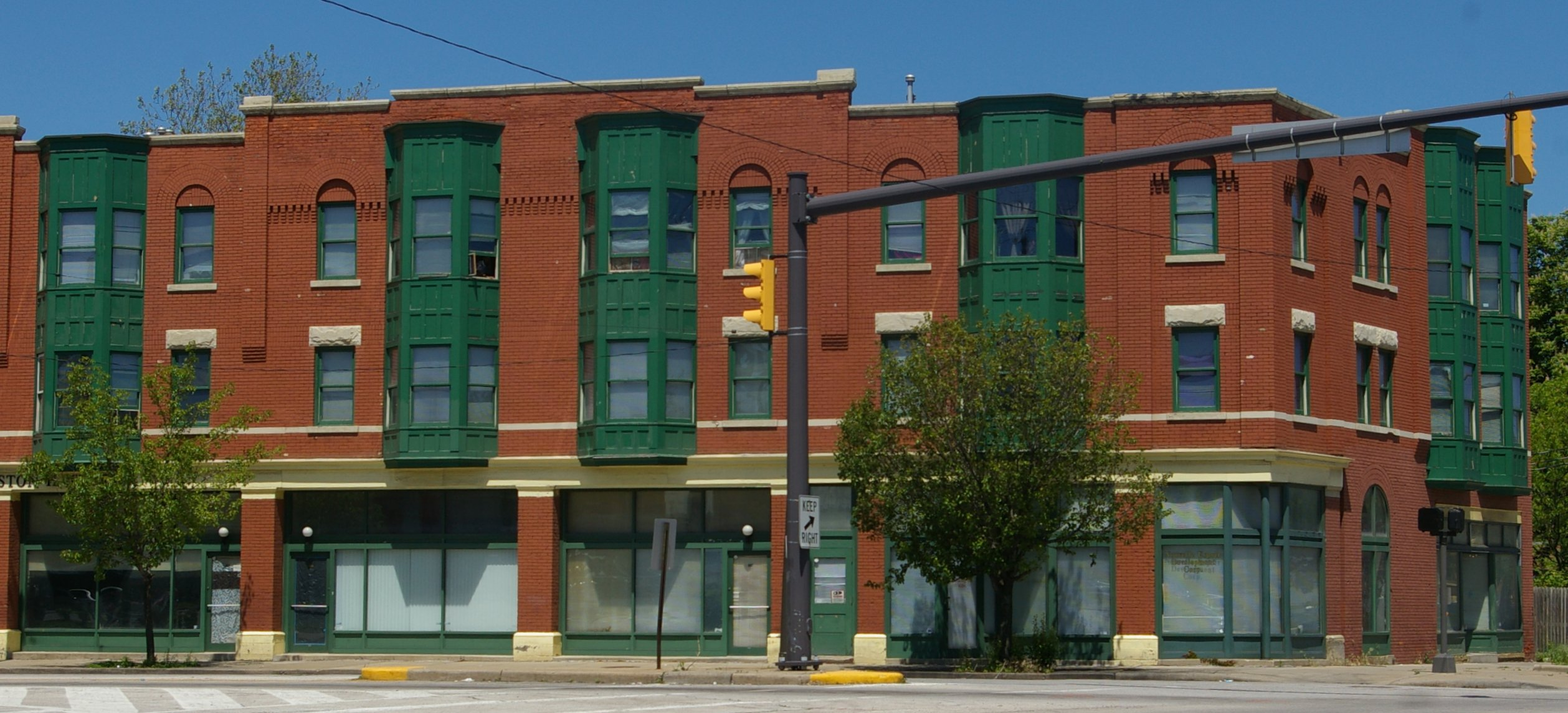

- Location within Cleveland Location within Ohio Location within the United States
- Location: 4925-4955 Payne Avenue and 1692-1696 E. 55th Street, Cleveland, Ohio, U.S.
- Coordinates: 41°30′46″N 81°39′09″W
- Built: 1893
- Architect: George H. Smith
- Architectural style: Queen Anne
- Website: https://bodyblockarcade.com/
- NRHP reference No.: 98001178
- Added to NRHP: September 18, 1998

The Body Block, also known as the Charles Body Block and as the Old Smith Arcade, is a historic mixed-use building located on the northwest corner of the intersection of Payne Avenue and E. 55th Street in the Goodrich–Kirtland Park neighborhood of Cleveland, Ohio, in the United States. Erected from 1892 to 1893, the Queen Anne style structure was built for Charles Body, owner of a local wallpaper store. It underwent a major renovation from 1994 to 1995, and was added to the National Register of Historic Places on September 18, 1998.

== History of the building ==
The Body Block began construction in 1892, and was completed in 1893. The building was commissioned and owned by Charles Body, a local businessman who owned a wallpaper store. Although it is not known for certain, the architect was likely George H. Smith, a local architect of note who designed the 1888 Cleveland Arcade.

Located at the intersection of Payne Avenue and E. 55th Street in the Goodrich–Kirtland Park neighborhood, the three-story structure has a 220-foot (67 m) frontage on Payne Avenue and a 60-foot (18 m) frontage on E. 55th Street. The structure was built of brick with a wood frame, with the interior walls coated with asbestos and mineral wool for fireproofing. The building's ground floor contained space for roughly 10 retail stores, while the upper two floors contained 44 apartments. An arcade ran through the center of the building, lit from above by a skylight with 0.25-inch-thick (0.64 cm) glass. Walkways connected the two sides of the building on the second floor. The total cost of the structure was $30,000 ($1,100,000 in 2025 dollars).

Known as the Body Block and as the Charles Body Block, the building was also referred to as the "Old Smith Arcade" due to its resemblance to Smith's Cleveland Arcade. Goodrich-Kirtland Park was largely a rural area when annexed by the city of Cleveland in 1850. It began to urbanize in the 1870s and 1880s, and the Body Block was constructed in the middle of the 20-year period that marked the neighborhood's swiftest growth and height (in terms of population). Located at the intersection of two major thoroughfares, it catered to middle class individuals and families and made a significant contribution to the retail and residential life of the area.

The Body Block suffered a severe fire on January 30, 1897, when chemicals in the basement of a ground-floor pharmacy spontaneously combusted. The major three-alarm fire caused $4,000 ($200,000 in 2025 dollars) in damages, but no one was injured or killed.

The Goodrich–Kirtland Park area began to lose housing after 1920 as it increasingly industrialized. During Prohibition, criminals being chased by the police would flee into the area to evade them, giving the neighborhood as reputation has a haven for crime. The Body Block lost its middle-class respectability, and became home to less wealthy working class families and widows. From 1920 to 1950, the area's population stayed roughly steady at about 65,000 people. It was a diverse area which included immigrants from Eastern Europe and Jews, and there was a substantial African American population since landlords in Goodrich-Kirtland Park were among the few in the city who would rent to blacks. The neighborhood was economically well-developed, with several retail shopping districts, movie theaters, and restaurants. After 1950, the neighborhood became overwhelmingly black and poor, as African Americans leaving the Deep South came to Cleveland looking for work during the Second Great Migration. What few residential areas remained in Goodrich–Kirtland Park became heavily overcrowded. The crack cocaine epidemic of the 1980s drove large numbers of people out of the neighborhood, and the population fell to just 13,000. as crack moved in, working-class blacks moved farther east, and block after block of homes and businesses were demolished in the name of urban renewal. Several blocks of buildings were abandoned, while others were demolished. Business fled the area, city services such as trash pick-up and street maintenance became irregular, illegal dumping became common, and the police presence was poor. The building's decline continued into the early 1990s, by which time it was primarily empty and decrepit. Homeless individuals used it as a refuge, and extensive drug trafficking occurred there.

=== 1994-1995 renovation ===
In 1991, the Nouvelle Espoir Development Corp. purchased the Body Block with the intention of renovating it. The company received a 10-year, $210,000 ($500,000 in 2025 dollars) federal low-income housing tax credit in 1992. The following year, the company received a 30-year, $466,000 ($1,000,000 in 2025 dollars) state historic tax credit; a $300,000 ($700,000 in 2025 dollars) loan from the Cleveland Housing Trust Fund; a $400,000 ($900,000 in 2025 dollars) loan from the Ohio Housing Trust Fund; and a $50,000 ($100,000 in 2025 dollars) grant from the Cleveland weatherization fund. In 1994, 11 banks agreed to lend the remaining $1.5 million ($3,300,000 in 2025 dollars) needed for the $2.8 million ($6,100,000 in 2025 dollars) renovation project. The restoration and renovation of the Body Block left it with 49 one- and two-bedroom apartments on the second and third floors, and retail space on the first floor. All units were available for rent only to low-income individuals and families who were participating in employment programs run by the city.

Construction began in April 1994, and was set for completion in February 1995. Zelina-Sandvick Architects designed the renovation, which completely overhauled the building's electrical, heating, and plumbing systems and added a playground to the rear of the building.

In April 2017, the building was purchased by real estate company Smartland11, LLC, the latter of which has its headquarters based in Cleveland.
