= Operation Blockade =

2002 video game

- Developer: ScreamingGames
- Publisher: Infogrames
- Platform: Windows
- Release: NA: May 29, 2002
- Genre: First-Person Shooter

Operation Blockade is a 2002 first-person shooter video game developed by ScreamingGames and published by Infogrames for Microsoft Windows. Set in a mock World War II environment, the game has online capabilities, and was released to mediocre reviews and criticism.

== Plot ==
During World War II, the Saruvian Empire invades and conquers the entire mainland of the United Sovereign Territories and only the southernmost island of Johnstown is free. The UST is able to build a small fort on a deserted island between the two nations though and use it to harass enemy supply lines. The UST is a fictional nation standing in for the United States, using all US weapons and medals. The Saruvian Empire is a fictional nation standing in for Germany, using all World War II era German weapons, uniforms, names, and political terms.

== Gameplay ==
As a tiny island outpost lying directly in the path of the supply line that the Saruvian Empire is using to invade his country, the player and his allies must defend against waves of enemy air, ground, and naval forces.

The game is a first-person shooter — all action occurs from the perspective of the character as it is navigated throughout the gaming environment. Players equip stronger weapons as the game continues, allowing them to destroy weak enemies quickly or take down larger opponents. The multiplayer component allows players to team up against the enemy forces and deploy tactics based on their personal styles.

Most combat occurs in a fixed bunker; the player shoots down planes and other enemies from this location with a full, 360-degree perspective. As with most arcade-style games, players accumulate points as they destroy enemy forces.

== Development ==
Developed by ScreamingGames and its sister company, Professor Fog's Workshop, Operation Blockade was loosely based on previous war shooters. Marketing manager Dennis Davidson said that the game appeals to a wider audience than previous developments, as it allows players to begin action sequences immediately. The team also strove for accuracy in military units and weapons, as a way to appeal to dedicated war gamers.

== Reception and criticism ==
Reception

Aggregate score
Aggregator	Score
Metacritic	49/100

Review scores
Publication	Score
AllGame	3/5
Computer Games Magazine	3/5
GameSpot	3.6/10
GameSpy	1/5
GameZone	7.5/10
IGN	4/10

Operation Blockade received "generally unfavorable reviews" according to the review aggregation website Metacritic. IGN cited the graphics as "ghastly and painful" and the gameplay as forcing the reviewer to "scream in pain", while citing the audio as "not all that bad". GameSpot criticized the game's gameplay as "repetitive, often frustrating" and the challenge as having "little skill involved". Unlike IGN, GameSpot considered the graphics the high point of the game, stating that the game "looks quite good".

== See also ==
- War game
