= Bloch (disambiguation) =

Bloch is a surname. It may also refer to:

- Bloch, short for Société des Avions Marcel Bloch, a French airplane manufacturer, used to designate said airplanes, e.g. Bloch MB.150
- Bloch Publishing Company, the oldest Jewish publishing company and one of the oldest family businesses in the United States
- Bloch (company), an Australian dancewear and shoe manufacturer
- Henry W. Bloch School of Management, part of the University of Missouri-Kansas City, United States
- Bloch (TV series), a German TV series
- Bloch Park, a baseball stadium in Selma, Alabama, United States
- Bloch Peak, Victoria Land, Antarctica

== See also ==
- Bloch Brothers Tobacco Company, a former company based in West Virginia, United States
- Block (disambiguation)
