= Blockbuster Pavilion =

Blockbuster Pavilion can refer to:

- Blockbuster Pavilion Charlotte, later Verizon Wireless Amphitheatre and PNC Music Pavilion, in Charlotte, North Carolina
- Blockbuster Pavilion San Bernardino, later Glen Helen Pavilion and Hyundai Pavilion and San Manuel Amphitheater, in Devore, California
