= Blockade (Stargate Universe) =

- Stargate Universe episode
- Destiny approaches the blue supergiant
- Episode no.: Season 2 Episode 19
- Directed by: Andy Mikita
- Written by: Linda McGibney
- Original air date: May 2, 2011

Guest appearances
- Julia Benson as Vanessa James; Peter Kelamis as Adam Brody; Jennifer Spence as Lisa Park; Patrick Gilmore as Dr. Dale Volker; Mike Dopud as Varro; Leanne Adachi as Cpl. Barnes; Lou Diamond Phillips as David Telford; Vincent Gale as Morrison

Episode chronology
← Previous "Epilogue"	Next → "Gauntlet"

"Blockade" is the nineteenth and penultimate episode of the second season of the military science fiction television series Stargate Universe. The episode originally aired on May 2, 2011 on Syfy in the United States. The episode was directed by longtime director and producer of the Stargate franchise Andy Mikita. It was written by Linda McGibney.

In this episode, the drones set up blockades at various stars at which the Destiny wishes to recharge. Unable to engage in another battle with the drones, Eli (David Blue) comes up with the idea to recharge in a blue supergiant. However, because of the intense heat that a blue supergiant puts out, it is extremely dangerous and requires both Eli and Dr. Rush (Robert Carlyle) to stay behind to pilot the ship. The rest of the crew are forced to gate to a planet where their descendants once lived and scavenge for supplies as they await the fate of the Destiny.

== Plot ==
In a standard power-braking maneuver, Destiny skirts a gas giant before a routine power recharge, but when they emerge from the shadow of the planet the crew discovers that their approach to the star is blocked by a Command ship, which immediately launches drones to attack Destiny. Fortunately, the power-brake maneuver leaves them far enough away from the ship to initiate a jump to FTL, with only minimal damage to Destiny, but having drained its critical power supplies. Col. Young suggests another star, but having Destiny drop far enough away to assess the region first. Young's caution pays off as another Command ship awaits them at the star, and Destiny jumps back into FTL to escape.

The crew suspects that Command ships will await them at every red dwarf star that Destiny normally uses for energy, creating a blockade. Eli proposes using a blue supergiant to recharge instead; Destiny would be able tolerate the higher temperatures though the interior of the ship would become impossible to live in. Instead, leaving a few personnel aboard in the space suits that can withstand the temperatures, the rest of the crew would use the Stargate to safety stay on a nearby planet until the fueling process is complete. Young reports to Col. Telford on Earth on the plan; Telford insists on bringing expert pilots aboard via the communication stones to handle the maneuver, but Dr. Rush assures that he and Eli are the most experienced pilots for Destiny.

The crew begins to gather as many perishable goods as possible prior to evacuation, particular as many plants from the hydroponics dome and putting them into refrigerated storage. Dr. Park convinces Young to let her stay aboard, using the third suit, to continue to collect and save as many of the plants as possible before Destiny enters the star. Destiny drops out of FTL sooner than anticipated, and the crew race to evacuate the ship as it draws closer to the star, finding themselves in an apparently-abandoned Earth-like city.

Eli and Dr. Rush initiate the approach to the star. Just as Dr. Park is ready to leave the dome, the doors seal shut, and cannot be overridden; Dr. Rush suspects that Destiny knows the dome will not survive the extreme temperatures and already shut off the section, despite his attempts to abort their path towards the star. Knowing that he needs Eli's attention on the flight controls, Dr. Rush advises Dr. Park to submerge and secure herself in the water collection pool to survive the heat for as long as possible. As the ship skims the star and collects energy, the dome ruptures, igniting the plants and pulling the remains into the void of space. Dr. Park barely hangs on through the maneuver. Eventually, once the ship is cleared, Eli is able to override the door seals and frees Dr. Park. Though she is safe, she has suffered from flash blindness.

On the planet, Young organizes teams to search the remains for any supplies. They come to learn that the planet was attacked by drones in the past, with most of the population fleeing through the Stargate. The recon teams encounter one of the drones and are able to subdue it. However, a civilian, realizing there are still drones around, panics and tries to open the Stargate, alerting the drones to their presence. The recon teams race back to protect the crew just as a command ship lands on the surface. Young orders the Stargate opened back to the ship ten minutes early. Though the ship is still cooling down, the crew is safely recovered with the meager supplies, and TJ races to provide medical support to Dr. Park. While the ship has been recharged, the crew recognize that blue supergiants are even more rare than red dwarfs, and they will not likely be able to use the same ruse again against the Command ships.

== Reception ==
"Blockade" was viewed by 0.993 million live viewers, resulting in a 0.7 Household rating, a 0.3 among adults 18–49.

Meredith Woerner from io9 was mainly positive about the episode praising the dynamic between Eli and Rush. She says "Eli and Rush battle it out on the deck over what to do... It's a hard moment for Eli, but for the first time he had to make the hard decision for the greater good. It will be interesting to see how this changes his character (even if it's for only one more episode)." However she was much more critical of the rest of the episode, referring to the off-world situation calling it "very stereotypical Stargate" and was extremely disapproving of Morrison claiming it to be a "faceless jerk who freaks out and ruins things for everyone." Mike Moody from TVSquad praised the episode saying that "Impressive episodes like "Blockade" are making this cancellation business really hard to swallow." He echoed similar sentiments shared by Woerner stating that "One of the most joyous things about "Blockade" was watching Eli step up and take charge of what was arguably Destiny's most dangerous mission ever. I also loved seeing Rush slyly push Eli to stand up and believe in himself." Moody also gave insight into Rush's personality saying he has "come a long way from the uncaring lone wolf we met in the series pilot. Rush is the guy who can bury his emotions and make the hard decisions -- like potentially sacrificing someone to save the ship and the lives of its crew." John M. Guilfoil from Blast Magazine was also positive about the episode but was reminded that "after the action-packed Blockade episode, that left one crew member blind in another emotional performance, there's only one left before Universe goes away for good." Guilfoil praised the whole episodic arc saying that the "episodes "Common Descent" and "Epilogue" stack up with anything else on SyFy and did the "time travel" angle better than SG-1 and Atlantis ever did... In some weird loop of time, a copy of the Destiny arrived later and found "their people". The resulting interaction was the best piece of television the Stargate franchise has put out in years."
