= Blockade (2016 film) =

2016 documentary film by Arif Yousuf

- Directed by: Arif Yousuf
- Screenplay by: Tasbir Imam, Arif Yousuf
- Based on: BLOCKADE: A Guide to Nonviolent Intervention by Richard Taylor
- Starring: Sultana Alam; Richard Taylor; Phyllis Taylor
- Edited by: Tasbir Imam
- Music by: Sujan E. Bin Wadud
- Release date: January 30, 2016
- Running time: 85 minutes
- Countries: United States; Bangladesh
- Language: English

Blockade is a 2016 documentary film by Arif Yousuf on nonviolent peace activism in the US protesting the genocide of Bangladesh (then East Pakistan) in 1971. This depicts the story of nonviolent actions to stop the shipment of arms from the US to Pakistan during the 1971 Bangladesh Liberation War.

== Synopsis ==
In early 1971, Bengalis in eastern parts of Pakistan had voted on their right to govern after a convincing election victory. Shortly afterward a humanitarian crisis and war extended down the Bengal Delta as the military dictatorship attempted to repress the people. The events eventually led to the birth of an independent Bangladesh.

== Accolades ==
Film Festival	Award
2017 The World's Independent Film Festival, San Francisco, California	Winner, Best Documentary Feature
2017 International Freethought Film Festival, Orlando, Florida	Official Selection
