= Bloc Hotels =

UK hotel chain

- Company type: Private
- Industry: Hotel chain
- Founded: 2010
- Headquarters: Gatwick Airport, UK
- Area served: United Kingdom
- Key people: Rob Morgan, Managing Director
- Website: blochotels.com

Bloc Hotels are a UK based hotel chain. It is noted for the innovative design of its hotel rooms, which are constructed offsite, and then installed in a hotel. The concept was created after Bloc's founders studied capsule hotels, which are commonly located in Japan.

== Overview and design ==
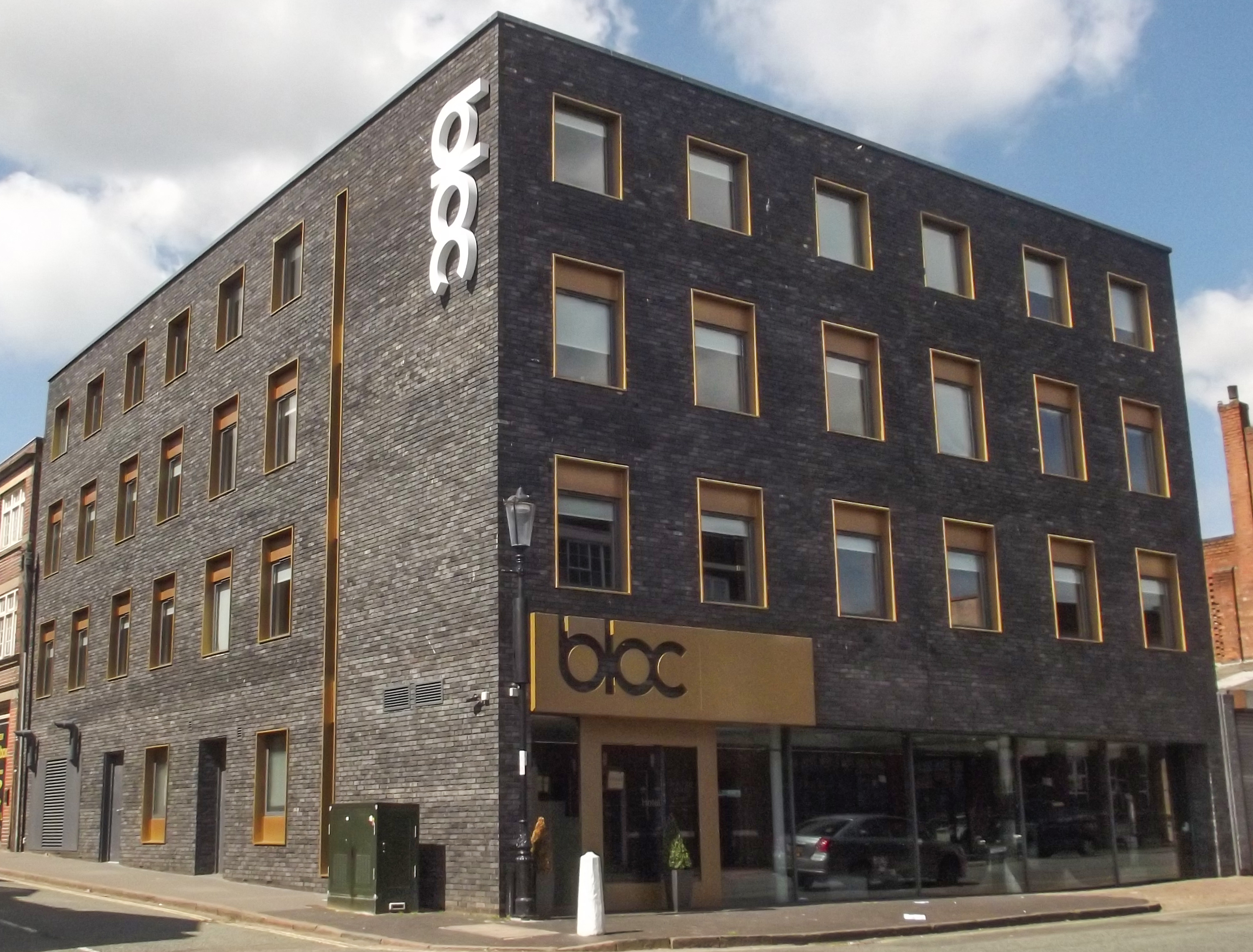
BLOC hotel in Birmingham

The concept is inspired by Japanese capsule hotels, which focus on creating rooms for guests in small places. The construction technique was implemented by BoxBuild a UK based construction company. Their method of implementation of the hotel was to manufacture each room individually offsite, and then stack the rooms in situ so the hotel exterior could be built around them.

The group's approach is to cut costs through effective usage of space while offering good design, quality and style. Bloc Hotels focuses on the sleep and shower experiences of its clients avoiding unnecessary elements, such as the wardrobe. The company's intention is to open its hotels in places where space is at a premium, and where local infrastructure and facilities are good.

The company opened its first hotel in the Jewellery Quarter. of Birmingham in 2011. According to the company the hotel was planned and built in 25 weeks, with the construction of the core structure finished in just 8 days. It has 73 rooms. An extension to the hotel was opened in October 2016 consisting of 35 Apartment style hotel suites.

In 2012, the group announced that it would be opening a second hotel, located at the Gatwick Airport. Rob Morgan, managing director of the Bloc Hotels, was reported to secure £7 million funding package from NatWest to start construction of the hotel. According to Morgan, the Gatwick hotel would be owned under 99-years lease from the airport. The hotel is in a renovated office block, having four floors, built above (rather than inside) the terminal. It has 245 rooms with most having external windows and opened in April 2014. Guests can control room settings from an app.

In September 2016 Birmingham City Council unanimously approved plans for Bloc Grand Central a 270 ft hotel tower to be located opposite Birmingham's Grand Central Station. Construction is due to start in 2017 and will be Bloc Hotels second property in the city.

== Locations ==
The hotel chain has properties based in Gatwick Airport and Birmingham in the United Kingdom, with plans for several additions.
