= Blockbusting (game) =

Combinatorial game solved using overheating

Blockbusting is a two-player game in which players alternate choosing squares from a line of squares, with one player aiming to choose as many pairs of adjacent squares as possible and the other player aiming to thwart this goal. Elwyn Berlekamp introduced it in 1987, as an example for a theoretical construction in combinatorial game theory.

== Rules ==
Blockbusting is a partisan game for two players, meaning that the roles of the two players are not symmetric. These two players are often known as Red and Blue (or Right and Left); they play the game on an $n \times 1$ strip of squares called "parcels". Each player, in turn, claims and colors one previously unclaimed parcel until all parcels have been claimed. At the end, Left's score is the number of pairs of neighboring parcels both of which he has claimed. Left therefore tries to maximize that number while Right tries to minimize it. Adjacent Right-Right pairs do not affect the score.

Although the purpose of the game is to further the study of combinatorial game theory, Berlekamp provides an interpretation alluding to the practice of blockbusting by real estate agents: the players may be seen as rival agents buying up all the parcels on a street, where Left is a segregationist trying to place clients as neighbors of one another while Right is an integrationist trying to break up these segregated groups.

== Theory ==
In introducing the game of Blockbusting in 1987, Elwyn Berlekamp also introduced overheating, an operation for analyzing the theory of combinatorial games, and used Blockbusting as an example for that operation.

The operation of overheating was later adapted by Berlekamp and David Wolfe to warming to analyze the end-game of Go.

The analysis of Blockbusting may be used as the basis of a strategy for the combinatorial game of Domineering.
