= Block Party =

A block party is a neighbourhood festivity.

Block Party may refer to:

== Arts and entertainment ==
- "Block Party" (song), by Stacy Lattisaw and Johnny Gill, 1984
- "The Block Party" (Lisa Lopes song), 2001
- Block Party, an unreleased album by Missy Elliott
- "Blockparty", a 2005 song by Dana Nălbaru
- "Blockparty", a 2016 song by Miss Platnum
- "Bloxk Party", a 2018 song by Sada Baby featuring Drego
- Dave Chappelle's Block Party, a 2005 documentary film
- Block Party (2022 film), an American comedy film
- CBS Block Party, a television programming block
- Cartoon Network: Block Party, a Game Boy Advance video game
- Blockparty, a demoscene
- Block Party (Big Love), an episode of the American TV series Big Love

== Other uses ==
- Block Party (company), a company that provides a browser plugin to edit privacy settings
- Block Party!, a robotics competition
- Block party, a prohibited debt collection practice under the Fair Debt Collection Practices Act
- BlockParty, software for Character Technical Directors
- Celebrity Block Party, an alternative name for the Blockout 2024 movement
- Blockbuster Block Party, a short-lived, adult-oriented, indoor entertainment complex

== See also ==
- Bloc party, a political party that is a constituent member of an electoral bloc
- Bloc Party, an English rock band
- Animation Block Party, a film festival in New York City, U.S.
- Basilica Block Party, a music festival in Minneapolis, Minnesota, U.S.
- Block Party Music and Art Festival, a music festival in Haebangchon, Seoul, South Korea
- Western Block Party, a Canadian political party
