= Ohio Technical College =

For-profit automotive college in Cleveland, Ohio

- Type: Private
- Established: 1969
- Chancellor: Jaret Bevan
- Students: 1,500
- Location: Cleveland, Ohio, United States; 41°31′06″N 81°39′26″W
- Website: www.ohiotech.edu

Ohio Technical College is a private for-profit automotive technical college in Cleveland, Ohio. It offered its first classes in 1969 as Ohio Diesel Mechanics School. OTC offers programs in automotive, auto-diesel, collision, diesel, manufacturer, motor sports, PowerSport, restoration and welding.

== History ==
In 1969, Ohio Diesel Mechanics School offered one 6-week course with phases in Cummins 4-stroke engine, Detroit 2-stroke engine and basic diesel fundamentals. In 1972, the school’s name changed to Ohio Diesel Technical Institute, and, in 1981, automotive diesel was added to the curriculum. In 1984, an Automotive Technology program was added. In 1987, the Motorcycle and Small Engine Training program was added, following a name change to Ohio Auto/Diesel Technical Institute. A new Associate of Technical Studies degree program was developed and approved in 1994. Because of its new degree-granting ability, the school was renamed Ohio Auto Diesel Technical College the following year.

In 2000, BMW of North America entered into contract with OTC to provide the FAST Track program, which stands for Factory Advanced Skilled Training. In 2003, High Performance and Racing and Alternative Fuel Technology classes were added to the curriculum. Over the next few years, additional programs were added, including a Custom Paint and Graphics specialization program, the Complete Automotive Technology program, and the Alternative Fuels and High Performance and Racing program. In 2008, the PowerSport Institute (PSI) branch campus was completed and played host to OTC's motorcycle technician training division. In 2010, OTC partnered with Edelbrock to offer a 12-week course that focuses on building and tuning American muscle cars and performance vehicles.

The college's expanding program has resulted in it being included several times appeared on the Weatherhead list of the 100 fastest growing companies in Northeast Ohio. In 2010 the college had about 1,000 students; the new programs raised this to 1,500 in 2011.
