= Men's Wear =

Painting by John Brack

- Artist: John Brack
- Year: 1953
- Medium: oil on canvas
- Dimensions: 81.0 cm × 114.0 cm (31.9 in × 44.9 in)
- Location: National Gallery of Australia, Canberra
- Website: http://artsearch.nga.gov.au/Detail.cfm?IRN=86648

Men's Wear is a 1953 painting by Australian artist John Brack. The painting depicts the interior of a menswear store, including the proprietor and some mannequins, standing in front of displays of ties and trousers. A mirror in the background reflects a silhouette of the artist.

It seems to be a simple image of an ordinary shop, but its simplicity is deceptive. There’s a complex interaction of lines of sight, for a start; and the jokey inclusion of the silhouetted figure opens up the interior space to the space outside the shop, outside the pictorial space even. And there’s a play - inspired, perhaps, by Magritte - between man, mannequin and silhouette that creates ambiguity. It’s a sort of surrealism of the high street.

— Kitty Hauser,

Brack painted the work while he was Art Master at Melbourne Grammar School. It is one of a series of paintings, including The Barber's Shop (1952) and The Fish Shop (1955) of small high street businesses.

The painting was acquired by the National Gallery of Australia in 1982 and is now part of its Australian Art collection.
