= Cooling and heating (combinatorial game theory) =

Operations adjusting incentives of combinatorial games

In combinatorial game theory, cooling, heating, and overheating are operations on hot games to make them more amenable to the traditional methods of the theory, which was originally devised for cold games in which the winner is the last player to have a legal move. Overheating was generalised by Elwyn Berlekamp for the analysis of Blockbusting. Chilling (or unheating) and warming are variants used in the analysis of the endgame of Go.

Cooling and chilling may be thought of as a tax on the player who moves, making them pay for the privilege of doing so, while heating, warming and overheating are operations that more or less reverse cooling and chilling.

== Basic operations: cooling, heating ==
The cooled game $G_t$ ("$G$ cooled by $t$") for a game $G$ and a (surreal) number $t$ is defined by

$$G_t  = \begin{cases} \{ G^L_t - t \mid G^R_t + t \} & \text { for all numbers } t \leq \text{ any number } \tau \text{ for which }  G_\tau \text{ is infinitesimally close to some number } m \text{ , }\\
m & \text{ for } t > \tau
\end{cases}$$.

The amount $t$ by which $G$ is cooled is known as the temperature; the minimum $\tau$ for which $G_\tau$ is infinitesimally close to $m$ is known as the temperature $t(G)$ of $G$; $G$ is said to freeze to $G_\tau$; $m$ is the mean value (or simply mean) of $G$.

Heating is the inverse of cooling and is defined as the "integral"

$$\int^t G = \begin{cases} G & \text{ if } G \text{ is a number, } \\
\{ \int^t (G^L) + t \mid \int^t (G^R) - t \} & \text{ otherwise. }
\end{cases}$$

== Multiplication and overheating ==
Norton multiplication is an extension of multiplication to a game $G$ and a positive game $U$ (the "unit") defined by

$$G.U = \begin{cases} G \times U & \text{ (i.e. the sum of } G \text{ copies of } U \text{) if } G \text{ is a non-negative integer, } \\
-G \times -U & \text{ if } G \text{ is a negative integer, } \\
\{ G^L.U + (U + I) \mid G^R.U - (U + I) \} \text { where } I \text { ranges over } \Delta (U) & \text{ otherwise. }
\end{cases}$$

The incentives $\Delta (U)$ of a game $U$ are defined as $\{ u - U : u \in U^L \} \cup \{ U - u : u \in U^R \}$.

Overheating is an extension of heating used in Berlekamp's solution of Blockbusting, where $G$ overheated from $s$ to $t$ is defined for arbitrary games $G, s, t$ with $s > 0$ as

$$\int_s^t G = \begin{cases} G . s & \text{ if } G \text{ is an integer, } \\
\{ \int_s^t (G^L) + t \mid \int_s^t (G^R) - t \} & \text{ otherwise. }
\end{cases}$$

Winning Ways also defines overheating of a game $G$ by a positive game $X$, as

$$\int_0^t G = \left\{ \int_0^t (G^L) + X \mid \int_0^t (G^R) - X \right\}$$

Note that in this definition numbers are not treated differently from arbitrary games.
Note that the "lower bound" 0 distinguishes this from the previous definition by Berlekamp

== Operations for Go: chilling and warming ==
Chilling is a variant of cooling by $1$ used to analyse the Go endgame of Go and is defined by

$$f(G) = \begin{cases} m & \text{ if } G \text{ is of the form } m \text{ or } m *,  \\
\{ f(G^L) - 1 \mid f(G^R) + 1 \} & \text{ otherwise.}
\end{cases}$$

This is equivalent to cooling by $1$ when $G$ is an "even elementary Go position in canonical form".

Warming is a special case of overheating, namely $\int_{1*}^1$, normally written simply as $\int$ which inverts chilling when $G$ is an "even elementary Go position in canonical form". In this case the previous definition simplifies to the form

$$\int G = \begin{cases} G & \text{ if } G \text{ is an even integer, } \\
G * & \text{ if } G \text{ is an odd integer, } \\
\{ \int (G^L) + 1 \mid \int (G^R) - 1 \} & \text{ otherwise. }
\end{cases}$$
