= Aschbacher block =

Finite group in mathematics

In finite group theory, a branch of mathematics, a block, sometimes called Aschbacher block, is a subgroup giving an obstruction to Thompson factorization and pushing up. Blocks were introduced by Michael Aschbacher.

== Definition ==
A group L is called short if it has the following properties (Aschbacher & Smith 2004, definition C.1.7):

1. L has no subgroup of index 2
2. The generalized Fitting subgroup F*(L) is a 2-group O_{2}(L)
3. The subgroup U = [O_{2}(L), L] is an elementary abelian 2-group in the center of O_{2}(L)
4. L/O_{2}(L) is quasisimple or of order 3
5. L acts irreducibly on U/C_{U}(L)

An example of a short group is the semidirect product of a quasisimple group with an irreducible module over the 2-element field F_{2}

A block of a group G is a short subnormal subgroup.
