= Non-blocking =

Non-blocking or nonblocking may refer to:

- non-blocking I/O, see asynchronous I/O
- Non-blocking synchronization
- Nonblocking minimal spanning switch
