= Block =

Block or blocked may refer to:

== Arts, entertainment and media ==
=== Broadcasting ===
- Block programming, the result of a programming strategy in broadcasting
- W242BX, a radio station licensed to Greenville, South Carolina, US known as 96.3 the Block
- WFNZ-FM, a radio station licensed to Harrisburg, North Carolina, US, branded as 92.7 The Block
- "Blocked", an episode of the television series The Flash

=== Music ===
- Block Entertainment, a record label
- Blocks Recording Club, a record label
- Woodblock (instrument), a small piece of slit drum made from one piece of wood and used as a percussion instrument
- "Blocks", by C418 from Minecraft – Volume Beta, 2013

=== Toys ===
- Toy block, one of a set of wooden or plastic pieces, of various shapes
- Unit block, a type of standardized wooden toy block for children

=== Video games ===
- Blocked (video game), a puzzle game for the iPhone and iPod Touch

== Building and construction ==
- Concrete block, cinder block or cement block, a concrete masonry unit for building
- Compressed earth block, a building block or unit for construction
- Glass brick, also known as glass block
- Tower block, a high-rise building

== Land subdivisions ==
- Block (district subdivision), administrative region in some South Asian countries
- Block (rural Australia), a small agricultural landholding
- City block, the smallest area that is surrounded by streets

== Places ==
=== United States ===
- Block, Kansas, an unincorporated community
- Block, Tennessee, an unincorporated community
- Block Island, an island in the state of Rhode Island

== Science and technology ==
=== Computing ===
- Blockchain, a segment of an open list of data records
- Block (data storage), the practice of storing electronic data in equally sized units
  - Block (Flash memory)
- Block (Internet), technical measures to restrict users' access to certain internet resources
  - Blocking access to certain websites, one form of internet censorship
- Block or subnet of the Internet, a subset of the internet in a set of contiguous IP addresses
- Block (programming), a group of declarations and statements treated as a unit
- Block (telecommunications), a unit of data transmission
- Block artifact, a type of distortion in a compressed image
- Block-level element, in the HTML markup language
- Blocks (C language extension), an extension to the C programming language designed to support parallel programming
- Unicode block, a named range of codepoints in Unicode
  - Block Elements, a Unicode block of block-shaped characters

=== Engineering ===
- Engine block and cylinder block, the main part of an internal combustion engine
- Block (sailing), a single or multiple pulley used on sailboats

=== Medicine ===
- Nerve block, or regional nerve blockade, any deliberate interruption of signals traveling along a nerve, often for the purpose of pain relief
- Third-degree atrioventricular block (AV block), a medical condition

=== Mathematics ===
- Block (permutation group theory)
- Block, in modular representation theory
- Block, in graph theory, is a biconnected component, a maximal biconnected subgraph of a graph
- Aschbacher block of a finite group
- Block design, a kind of set system in combinatorial mathematics
- Block matrix
- Block of a ring, a centrally primitive idempotent or the ideal it generates

=== Other uses in science and technology ===
- Block (periodic table), a set of adjacent groups in the periodic table
- Block (meteorology), large-scale patterns in the atmospheric pressure field
- Fault block, a geologic zone or geologic province
- Block, Inc., an American technology company formerly known as Square

== Sports ==
- Block, a defensive shot in pickleball
- Block (basketball), when a defensive player legally deflects a shot
- Block (cricket), when a batsman deflects the ball to avoid getting out
- Blocking (American football)
- Blocking (martial arts)
- Starting blocks, devices used by sprinters to assist in preventing their feet from slipping as they break into a run
- The Block (basketball), a defensive play in game 7 of the 2016 NBA Finals

== Transportation ==
- Block Number (aircraft), a system to differentiate between groups of US military aircraft of the same type with minor variants
- Signalling block system, a way of controlling train movement
- Blocking (transport), a way to assign public transport vehicles on a schedule

== People ==
- Block (musician) (Jamie Block), an anti-folk musician based in New York, US

== Other uses ==
- Block letters (also known as printscript, manuscript, print writing, or ball and stick in academics), a sans-serif (or "Gothic") style of writing
- Block party (also known as street party), a community social event
- Block scheduling, a type of academic scheduling
- Hat block, or block shaper, a wooden block carved into the shape of a hat by a craftsman
- Postage stamp block, an attached group of postage stamps

== See also ==
- Block House (disambiguation)
- Block number (disambiguation)
- Block Party (disambiguation)
- The Block (disambiguation)
- Blockbuster (disambiguation)
- Blockhead (disambiguation)
- Bloc (disambiguation)
- Blockade (disambiguation)
- Blockbuster (disambiguation)
- Blocker (disambiguation)
- Blocking (disambiguation)
- Blocky (disambiguation)
- Block 13
