= Blocker (surname) =

Blocker is a surname. Notable people with the surname include:

- Dan Blocker (1928–1972), American actor and Korean War veteran
- Darrell Blocker, nicknamed "The Spy Whisperer", American CIA agent
- Dirk Blocker (born 1957) American actor
- Terry Blocker (born 1959), American baseball player
