= Ivan Blok =

Governor of Samara during the Russian Revolution of 1905

Ivan Blok was the governor of Samara during the Russian Revolution of 1905. Shortly after giving a speech in which he complained that citizens directed "hate filled glances" at himself despite "wear[ing] out [his] nerves maintaining order so that people can live like human beings", he was killed by a bomb.
