= Land description =

In surveying and property law, a land description or legal description is a written statement that delineates the boundaries of a piece of real property. In the written transfer of real property, it is universally required that the instrument of conveyance (deed) include a written description of the property.

== Legal land description ==
=== Canada ===
- In many parts of Canada the original subdivision of crown land was done by township surveys. Different sizes of townships have been used (e.g. Québec's irregularly shaped cantons and Ontario's concession townships), but all were designed to provide rectangular farm lots within a defined rural community. The survey of a township was essentially a subdivision survey, because the plan of the township was registered and the lots (sometimes called sections) were numbered. The description of a whole lot for legal purposes is complete in the identification of the township and the lot within the township.
- A legal land description in Manitoba, Saskatchewan, and Alberta would be defined by the Dominion Land Survey. For example, the village of Yarbo, Saskatchewan is located at the legal land description of SE-12-20-33-W1, which would be the South East quarter of Section 12, Township 20, Range 33, West of the first meridian.
- A legal land description in British Columbia Fraser Valley Lower Mainland (Metro Vancouver) is defined by land surveys based out of New Westminster. Land in New Westminster Townsite corresponding to present day New Westminster is labelled as such while land outside the townsite is labelled as being in New Westminster District. The Main subdivisions are District Lots that represent parcel sales to settlers mostly in the time from 1860-1890. District lots are numbered from DL1 to over DL3,000. These District Lots are still represented on the cadastral maps of British Columbia. Later these lots would be subdivided to form blocks and residential lots. A typical address would thus indicate a lot number, a block range, and the original District Lot from which it was subdivided.
