= Hofstadter =

Hofstadter is a surname. Notable people with the surname include:

- Albert Hofstadter (1910–1989), American philosopher, brother of Robert and uncle of Douglas
- Douglas Hofstadter (born 1945), American professor, author of Gödel, Escher, Bach, nephew of Albert and son of Robert
- Richard Hofstadter (1916–1970), American historian, nephew of Samuel
- Robert Hofstadter (1915–1990), American Nobel Prize-winner in physics, brother of Albert and father of Douglas
- Samuel H. Hofstadter (1894–1970), New York politician and judge, uncle of Richard

Fictional characters:

- Beverly Hofstadter, a character in the television series The Big Bang Theory, mother of Leonard
- Leonard Hofstadter, a character in the television series The Big Bang Theory
- Penny Hofstadter, a character in the television series The Big Bang Theory, wife of Leonard

== See also ==
- Hofstadter's butterfly, a fractal
- Hofstadter Committee, a joint legislative investigating committee in New York 1931–1932
- Hofstadter's law, "It always takes longer than you expect ..."
- Hofstadter-Moebius loop, a condition that affected HAL 9000, a fictional computer
- Hofstadter points, in triangle geometry
- Hofstadter sequence, an integer sequence
- Geert Hofstede tramscultural social psychologist
