= Leo Moser =

Austrian-Canadian mathematician

- Born: 11 April 1921; Vienna, Austria
- Died: 9 February 1970 (aged 48); Edmonton, Alberta, Canada
- Education: University of Manitoba; University of Toronto; University of North Carolina
- Known for: Moser spindle Moser's circle problem Moser's worm problem Moser–de Bruijn sequence Erdős–Moser equation Lambek–Moser theorem Steinhaus–Moser notation Moving sofa problem Pancyclic graph
- Scientific career
- Workplaces: University of Alberta; Massachusetts Institute of Technology
- Doctoral advisor: Alfred Brauer

Leo Moser (11 April 1921 – 9 February 1970) was an Austrian-Canadian mathematician, best known for his polygon notation.

A native of Vienna, Leo Moser immigrated with his parents to Canada at the age of three. He received his Bachelor of Science degree from the University of Manitoba in 1943, and a Master of Science from the University of Toronto in 1945. After two years of teaching he went to the University of North Carolina to complete a PhD, supervised by Alfred Brauer. There, in 1950, he began suffering recurrent heart problems. He took a position at Texas Technical College for one year, and joined the faculty of the University of Alberta in 1951, where he remained until his death at the age of 48.

In 1966, Moser posed the question "What is the region of smallest area which will accommodate every planar arc of length one?" Rephrased to consider the planar arc a "worm", this became known as Moser's worm problem and as of 2026 remains an open problem.

== See also ==
- Bell number
- Berlekamp switching game
- Salem–Spencer set
- Secretary problem
- Tournament (graph theory)
- Erdős distinct distances problem
