= Wythoff array =

Infinite matrix of integers derived from the Fibonacci sequence

In mathematics, the Wythoff array is an infinite matrix of positive integers derived from the Fibonacci sequence and named after Dutch mathematician Willem Abraham Wythoff. Every positive integer occurs exactly once in the array, and every integer sequence defined by the Fibonacci recurrence can be derived by shifting a row of the array.

The Wythoff array was first defined by Morrison (1980) using Wythoff pairs, the coordinates of winning positions in Wythoff's game. It can also be defined using Fibonacci numbers and Zeckendorf's theorem, or directly from the golden ratio and the recurrence relation defining the Fibonacci numbers.

== Values ==
The Wythoff array has the values

$$\begin{matrix}
1&2&3&5&8&13&21&\cdots\\
4&7&11&18&29&47&76&\cdots\\
6&10&16&26&42&68&110&\cdots\\
9&15&24&39&63&102&165&\cdots\\
12&20&32&52&84&136&220&\cdots\\
14&23&37&60&97&157&254&\cdots\\
17&28&45&73&118&191&309&\cdots\\
\vdots&\vdots&\vdots&\vdots&\vdots&\vdots&\vdots&\ddots\\
\end{matrix}$$
(sequence A035513 in the OEIS).

== Equivalent definitions ==
Inspired by a similar Stolarsky array previously defined by Stolarsky (1977), Morrison (1980) defined the Wythoff array as follows. Let $\varphi=\tfrac12\left(1+\sqrt{5}\right)$ denote the golden ratio; then the $i$th winning position in Wythoff's game is given by the pair of positive integers $\left(\left\lfloor i\varphi\right\rfloor, \left\lfloor i\varphi^2\right\rfloor\right)$, where the numbers on the left and right sides of the pair define two complementary Beatty sequences that together include each positive integer exactly once. Morrison defines the first two numbers in row $m$ of the array to be the Wythoff pair given by the equation $i=\lfloor m\varphi\rfloor$, and where the remaining numbers in each row are determined by the Fibonacci recurrence relation. That is, if $A_{m,n}$ denotes the entry in row $m$ and column $n$ of the array, then

$$\begin{align}
A_{m,1} &= \left\lfloor \lfloor m\varphi \rfloor \varphi \right\rfloor , \\
A_{m,2} &= \left\lfloor \lfloor m\varphi \rfloor \varphi^2 \right\rfloor , \\
A_{m,n} &= A_{m,n-2}+A_{m,n-1} \quad \text{for } n > 2 \,.
\end{align}$$

The Zeckendorf representation of any positive integer is a representation as a sum of distinct Fibonacci numbers, no two of which are consecutive in the Fibonacci sequence. As Kimberling (1995) describes, the numbers within each row of the array have Zeckendorf representation that differ by a shift operation from each other, and the numbers within each column have Zeckendorf representations that all use the same smallest Fibonacci number. In particular the entry $A_{m,n}$ of the array is the $m$th smallest number whose Zeckendorf representation begins with the $(n+1)$th Fibonacci number.

== Properties ==
Each Wythoff pair occurs exactly once in the Wythoff array, as a consecutive pair of numbers in the same row, with an odd index for the first number and an even index for the second. Because each positive integer occurs in exactly one Wythoff pair, each positive integer occurs exactly once in the array (Morrison 1980).

Every sequence of positive integers satisfying the Fibonacci recurrence occurs, shifted by at most finitely many positions, in the Wythoff array. In particular, the Fibonacci sequence itself is the first row, and the sequence of Lucas numbers appears in shifted form in the second row (Morrison 1980).
