= Omond Solandt =

Canadian scientist (1909–1993)

Omond McKillop Solandt CC OBE CD FRSC
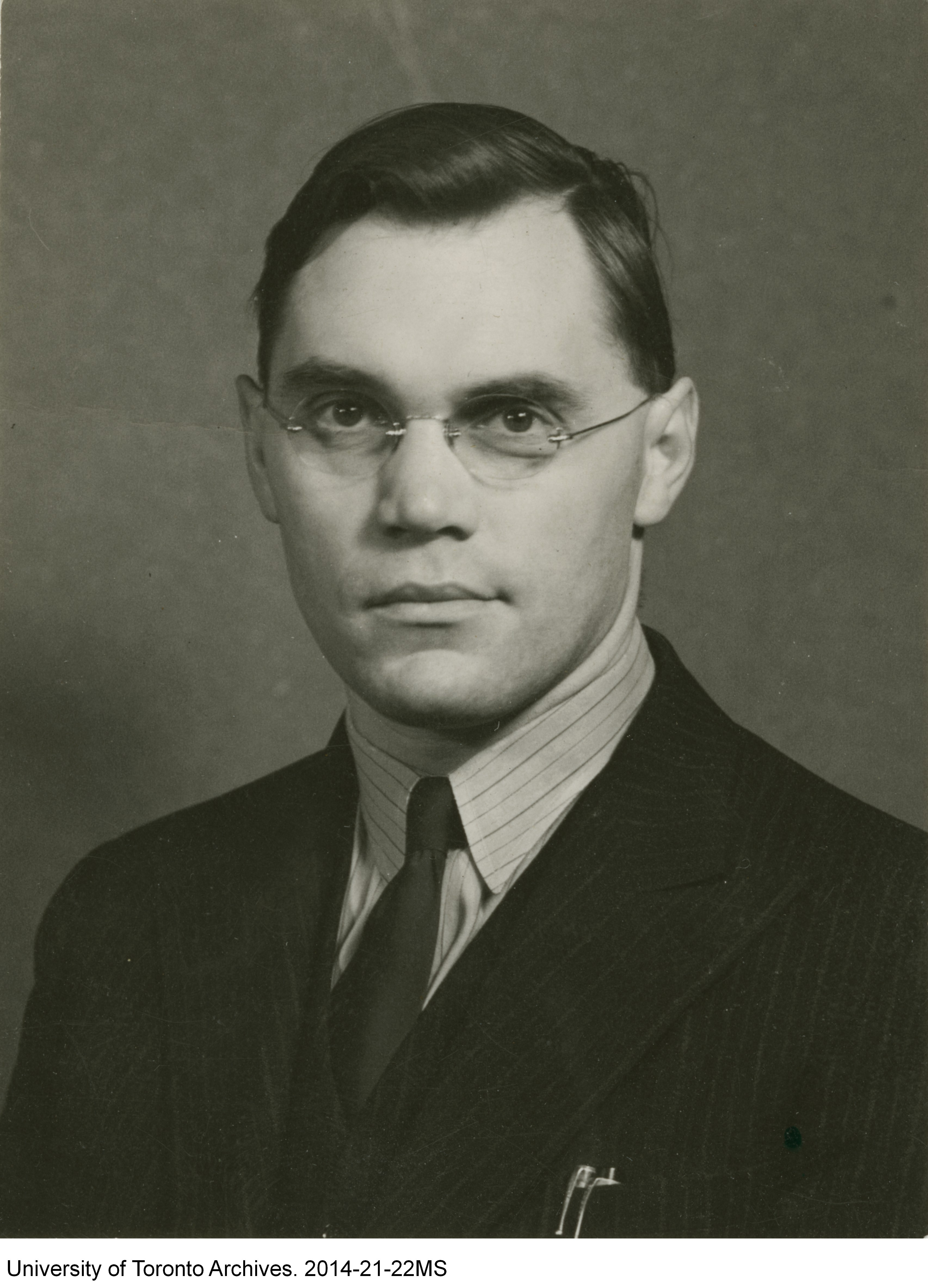
- 1940 photo of Omond Solandt from the Solandt Archives at the University of Toronto

23rd Chancellor of the University of Toronto
- In office 1965 – 1971
- President: Claude Bissell
- Preceded by: François Charles Archile Jeanneret
- Succeeded by: Pauline Mills McGibbon

Personal details
- Born: September 25, 1909 Winnipeg, Manitoba, Canada
- Died: May 12, 1993 (aged 83) Alliston, Ontario, Canada

Omond McKillop Solandt (September 25, 1909 – May 12, 1993) was a Canadian scientist who was the first Chairman of the Canadian Defence Research Board and 23rd chancellor of the University of Toronto.

== Early life ==
Born in Winnipeg, Manitoba, he graduated in medicine from the University of Toronto. He served his internship at Toronto General Hospital and following post-graduate work at the London Hospital, he accepted a permanent position on the staff of the Department of Physiology at Cambridge University, England.

== Career ==
In January 1941, he was appointed Director of the Medical Research Council Physiological Laboratory at the Armoured Fighting Vehicle School at Lulworth, England. He researched problems with tank design and physiological problems of tank personnel. He was appointed Deputy Superintendent of the Army Operational Research Group in 1943 and Superintendent in May 1944.

Dr. Solandt joined the Canadian Army in February 1944 with the rank of Colonel and continued as Director of the Army Operational Research Group until 1945 when he was appointed Director of the Operational Research Division, South-East Asia Command, and scientific advisor to Lord Louis Mountbatten, then Commander-in-Chief S.E.A.C.

Returning to England in June 1945, he was soon appointed to the War Office as a member of the joint Military Mission sent to Japan to evaluate the effects of the atomic bomb.

The Canadian government appointed him Director General of Defence Research on December 28, 1945, and Solandt helped plan postwar military research. In 1947 he became the founding chairman of the Defence Research Board and served as such through 1956. His Chairman position was at the same level as the Canadian Military Chiefs of Staff, and the Deputy Minister of National Defence.

From 1956-63 he was vice president for research and development at Canadian National Railways. He was vice president for research and development at De Havilland Aircraft from 1963-66. Then, until 1967, he was president of the Royal Canadian Geographical Society. From 1965 to 1971 he was Chancellor of the University of Toronto.

He was the founding Chairman of the Science Council of Canada. From 1966 to 1972 he acted as chairman of the council and was thus one of the most influential voices in the science policy debate of that period.

== Retirement ==
In retirement, Solandt was active as a company director and consultant, specializing in agricultural research in a number of developing countries (e.g., Peru, Kenya and Bangladesh).

== Honours ==
- In 1946 he was awarded the Order of the British Empire in the King's Birthday Honours List.
- In 1947 he was awarded an honorary Doctor of Science from the University of British Columbia.
- In 1950 he was awarded an honorary Doctor of Science from the University of Manitoba.
- In 1954 he honorary Doctor of Law from the University of Toronto.
- In 1956 he was awarded the Gold Medal for contribution to pure or applied science by the Professional Institute of the Public Service of Canada.
- In 1966 he received an honorary doctorate from Sir George Williams University, which later became Concordia University.
- In 1968 he was awarded an honorary Doctor of Law from the University of Saskatchewan.
- In 1970 he was made a Companion of the Order of Canada.
- In 1975 he was awarded the Vanier Medal from the Institute of Public Administration of Canada.
- He was a member of the Royal College of Physicians

Academic offices
Preceded by François Charles Archile Jeanneret	Chancellor of the University of Toronto; 1965–1971	Succeeded by Pauline Mills McGibbon
