= Willem Abraham Wythoff =

Dutch mathematician

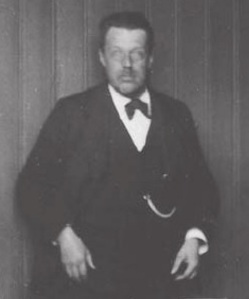
- Born: Willem Abraham Wijthoff; 6 October 1865; Amsterdam, Netherlands
- Died: 21 May 1939 (aged 73); Amsterdam, Netherlands
- Education: University of Amsterdam
- Known for: Wythoff's game; Wythoff construction; Wythoff symbol
- Relatives: Geertruida Wijthoff (sister)
- Scientific career
- Fields: Mathematics
- Doctoral advisor: Diederik Korteweg

Willem Abraham Wythoff (Dutch pronunciation: [ˈʋɪləm ˈaːbraːɦɑɱ ˈʋɛithɔf]; born Wijthoff; 6 October 1865 – 21 May 1939) was a Dutch mathematician.

== Biography ==
Wythoff was born in Amsterdam to Anna C. F. Kerkhoven and Abraham Willem Wijthoff, who worked in a sugar refinery. He studied at the University of Amsterdam, and earned his Ph.D. in 1898 under the supervision of Diederik Korteweg.

== Contributions ==
Wythoff is known in combinatorial game theory and number theory for his study of Wythoff's game, whose solution involves the Fibonacci numbers. The Wythoff array, a two-dimensional array of numbers related to this game and to the Fibonacci sequence, is also named after him.

In geometry, Wythoff is known for the Wythoff construction of uniform tilings and uniform polyhedra and for the Wythoff symbol used as a notation for these geometric objects.

== Personal life ==
Willem Abraham Wythoff was the youngest of four children born into the wealthy family of Abraham Willem Wijthoff and Anna Catharina Frederika Kerkhoven. His father was a Lutheran and son of the Amsterdam sugar refinery family Wijthoff & Son. His older sisters were: mathematician Geertruida "Truida" Wijthoff, writer Henriëtte Wijthoff and illustrator Anna Catharina Frederika Wijthoff.

== Selected publications ==
- Wythoff, W. A. (1905–1907), "A modification of the game of nim", Nieuw Archief voor Wiskunde, 2: 199–202.
- Wythoff, W. A. (1918), "A relation between the polytopes of the C600-family", Proceedings of the Section of Sciences, 20, Koninklijke Akademie van Wetenschappen te Amsterdam: 966–970, Bibcode:1918KNAB...20..966W.
