= Claude Bissell =

Canadian historian

Claude Bissell CC FRSC

8th President of the University of Toronto
- In office 1958–1971
- Chancellor: Samuel Beatty; François Charles Archile Jeanneret; Omond Solandt
- Preceded by: Moffat St. Andrew Woodside (acting)
- Succeeded by: John H. Sword (acting)

4th President and Vice-Chancellor of Carleton University
- In office 1956–1958
- Chancellor: Jack Mackenzie
- Preceded by: James Alexander Gibson (pro tempore)
- Succeeded by: Davidson Dunton

Personal details
- Born: February 10, 1916 Meaford, Ontario
- Died: June 21, 2000 (aged 84)
- Education: University of Toronto (BA, MA); Cornell University (PhD)

Claude Thomas Bissell CC FRSC (February 10, 1916 – June 21, 2000) was a Canadian author and educator. He served as the fourth president and vice-chancellor of Carleton University from 1956 to 1958 and the eighth president of the University of Toronto from 1958 to 1971.

== Biography ==
He was born in Meaford, Ontario, the youngest of nine children. He graduated from the University of Toronto with a Bachelor of Arts degree from University College in 1936 and a Master of Arts degree in English literature in 1937. He earned his PhD in English Literature from Cornell University where he won the Luana L. Messenger Prize for Graduate Research in 1940. He served in the Canadian Army during World War II.

In 1952 he was made assistant professor at University College. From 1956 to 1958 he was president of Carleton College (now Carleton University) returning to the University of Toronto in 1958 to become president.

Bissell was the eighth president of the University of Toronto from 1958 to 1971. He played a major part in the university's expansion and the establishment of five of its constituent colleges, tripling the size of the university during his tenure. Included was the founding of the University of Toronto's Scarborough campus (then known as Scarborough College) in 1964 and Mississauga campus (then known as Erindale College) in 1967.

He was the chair of the Canada Council from 1960 to 1962.

The Claude T. Bissell Building on the University of Toronto's St. George campus, which houses the Faculty of Information, is named after him.

He married Christine and they had one daughter, Deirdre MacDonald.

Because of his education, he was an officer in World War II, attaining the rank of captain in the Argyll and Sutherland Highlanders of Canada and worked in the intelligence section.

== Honours ==
- In 1957, he was elected a fellow of the Royal Society of Canada.
- In 1969 he was made a Companion of the Order of Canada.
- In 1976 he received an honorary Doctor of Letters from University of Leeds.

== Quotes ==
- "The Social Sciences are good at accounting for disasters once they have taken place."
- Referring to the Argyll and Sutherland Highlanders of Canada, his regiment in World War II, "a happy regiment and a formidable one in action."
- "Risk more than others think is safe. Care more than others think is wise. Dream more than others think is practical. Expect more than others think is possible."

== Selected bibliography ==
- University College: A Portrait - 1953
- Halfway Up Parnassus: A Personal Account of the University of Toronto 1932-71 - 1974
- A Brief Biography: Vincent Massey, 1887-1967 - 1981
- The Imperial Canadian: Vincent Massey in Office -1986
- Ernest Buckler Remembered - 1989
