= Marie du Saar =

Dutch ophthalmologist (1860–1955)

- Born: 1860
- Died: 1955 (aged 94–95)
- Other name: Marie Hammer-du Saar
- Education: University of Amsterdam, M.D. PhD.
- Occupation: Ophthalmologist
- Known for: Third woman physician in the Netherlands
- Spouse: Heinrich Hammer
- Children: Two

Marie Hammer-du Saar (1860–1955) was an independent Dutch ophthalmologist, the third woman to qualify as a physician in the Netherlands, and the first female medical consultant in the country.

== Biography ==
Du Saar was 16 years old when she first expressed an interest in becoming a physician. A scholarship from the Mennonite Church allowed her to pursue her ambition despite skepticism on the part of the fund's managers doubting that a female physician could attract patients. In 1881, with her scholarship in hand, du Saar enrolled at the Athenaeum Illustre of Amsterdam (now part of the University of Amsterdam). She and Geertruida Wijthoff, who registered as a student in mathematics at the same time, were two of the first women to study there, preceded only by the physician Aletta Jacobs. In 1888, du Saar passed her medical examinations becoming only the third woman to earn her M.D., after Aletta Jacobs and Catharine van Tussenbroek. Du Saar earned her PhD with honors from the University In 1890 on a subject related to pediatrics.

She organized a study trip abroad from February to June 1891 to visit physicians and an optics factory. In Jena, Germany, she visited the Carl Zeiss factory and studied microscopic lenses. In Prague, Vienna and Zurich, she met with Karl Hering, Siegmund Mayer, Ernst Fuchs, and Otto Haab. In Paris, she visited Louis de Wecker. During the two months she remained in Paris, she met the violinist and conductor Heinrich Hammer and married him in September 1892. They went on to have two children.

In 1891, she set up her private ophthalmology practice in Amsterdam but she had problems attracting male patients. A few women came to her office but not enough to sustain the business. It was only when she treated poor people at a charity clinic, the Institution for Eye Sickness, that men sought her care. She had to supplement her doctor's fees with other, more traditional, paid activities such as counseling women on hygiene, nutrition and general health education. Over time, this proved unsustainable and she closed her practice in 1898.

Du Saar and her best friend, painter Betsy Repelius, exchanged letters frequently from 1891–1911. The published letters describe du Saar's path through university, medical school, her private practice and marriage.

In reviewing the decline of du Saar's private practice, van Loosbroek says,

"Her status as a married woman and mother was also an obstacle to success. In her day it was not considered appropriate for married women to work. Several friends warned Du Saar on the eve of the wedding that this would jeopardize the practice of her profession. But she was in love and went through with the marriage."

After du Saar suffered two miscarriages in 1898, she remained very ill, causing a severe loss of income for the young family. An opportunity for her husband to take on a new conductor role caused the family to relocate to Bochum, Germany, a move opposed by du Saar who could not recover her medical practice there. She died in 1955.
