= Wythoff's game =

Two-player mathematical subtraction game

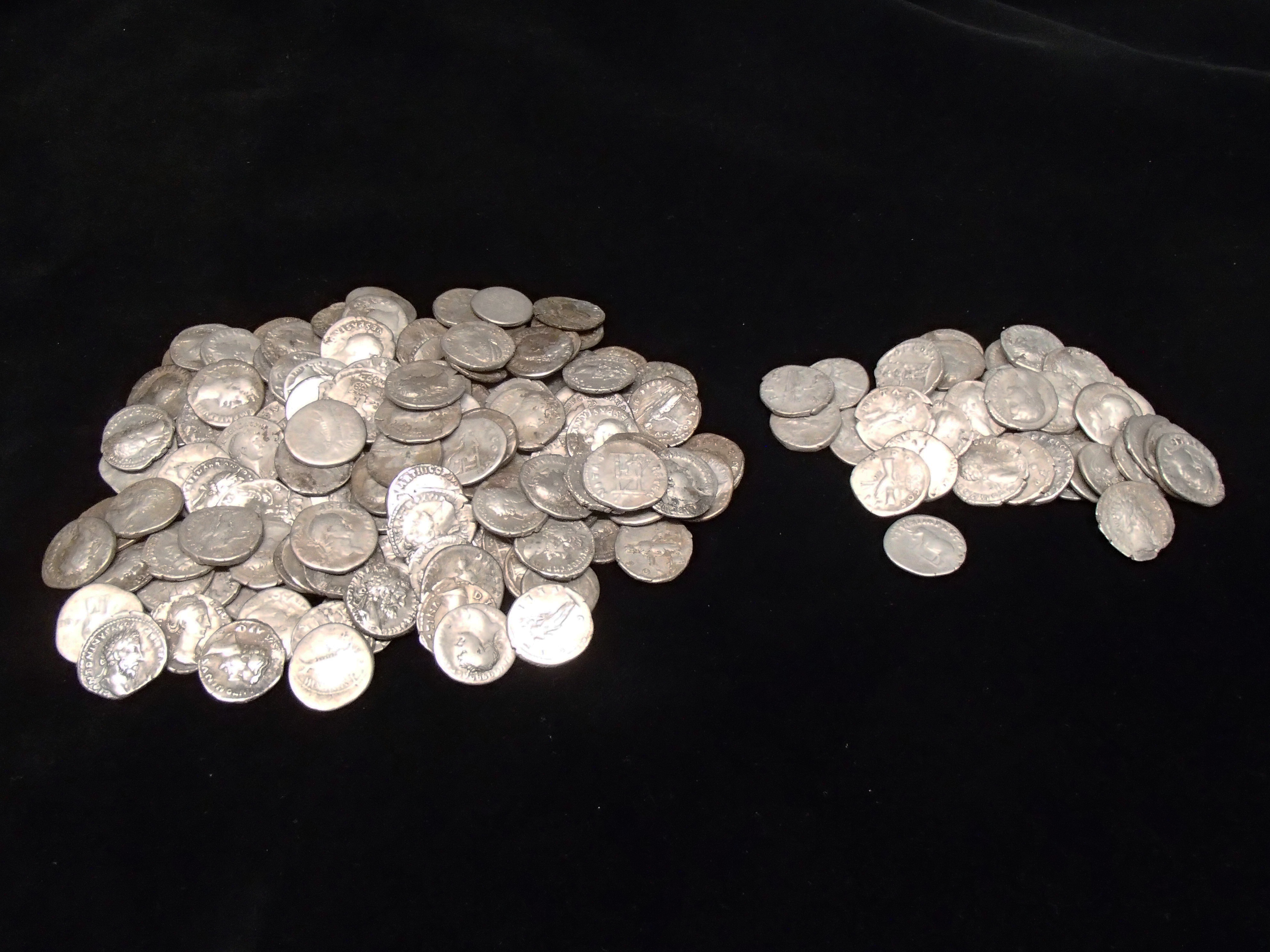
Wythoff's game is played with two piles of counters

Wythoff's game is a two-player mathematical subtraction game, played with two piles of counters. Players take turns removing counters from one or both piles; when removing counters from both piles, the numbers of counters removed from each pile must be equal. The game ends when one player removes the last counter or counters, thus winning.

An equivalent description of the game is that a single chess queen is placed somewhere on a large grid of squares, and each player can move the queen towards the lower left corner of the grid: south, west, or southwest, any number of steps. The winner is the player who moves the queen into the corner. The two Cartesian coordinates of the queen correspond to the sizes of two piles in the formulation of the game involving removing counters from piles.

Martin Gardner in his March 1977 "Mathematical Games column" in Scientific American claims that the game was played in China under the name 捡石子 jiǎn shízǐ ("picking stones"). The Dutch mathematician W. A. Wythoff published a mathematical analysis of the game in 1907.

== Optimal strategy ==
A visualization of Wythoff's game of Nim. The bottom leftmost square is position (1,1) and the red squares are cold positions. Note that the winning square is not included in the picture.

Any position in the game can be described by a pair of integers (n, m) with n ≤ m, describing the size of both piles in the position or the coordinates of the queen. The strategy of the game revolves around cold positions and hot positions: in a cold position, the player whose turn it is to move will lose with best play, while in a hot position, the player whose turn it is to move will win with best play. The optimal strategy from a hot position is to move to any reachable cold position.

The classification of positions into hot and cold can be carried out recursively with the following three rules:

1. (0,0) is a cold position.
2. Any position from which a cold position can be reached in a single move is a hot position.
3. If every move leads to a hot position, then a position is cold.

For instance, all positions of the form (0, m) and (m, m) with m > 0 are hot, by rule 2. However, the position (1,2) is cold, because the only positions that can be reached from it, (0,1), (0,2), (1,0) and (1,1), are all hot. The cold positions (n, m) with the smallest values of n and m are (0, 0), (1, 2), (3, 5), (4, 7), (6, 10) and (8, 13). (sequence A066096 and A090909 in OEIS) (Also see (sequence A072061 in the OEIS))

For misère game of this game, (0, 1) and (2, 2) are cold positions, and a position (n, m) with m, n > 2 is cold if and only if (n, m) in normal game is cold.

== Formula for cold positions ==
Wythoff discovered that the cold positions follow a regular pattern determined by the golden ratio. Specifically, if k is any natural number and

$$n_k = \lfloor k \phi \rfloor = \lfloor m_k \phi \rfloor -m_k \,$$
$$m_k = \lfloor k \phi^2 \rfloor = \lceil n_k \phi \rceil = n_k + k \,$$

where φ is the golden ratio and we are using the floor function, then (n_{k}, m_{k}) is the k^{th} cold position. These two sequences of numbers are recorded in the Online Encyclopedia of Integer Sequences as OEIS: A000201 and OEIS: A001950, respectively.

The two sequences n_{k} and m_{k} are the Beatty sequences associated with the equation

$$\frac{1}{\phi} + \frac{1}{\phi^2} = 1 \,.$$

As is true in general for pairs of Beatty sequences, these two sequences are complementary: each positive integer appears exactly once in either sequence.

== See also ==
- Nim
- Grundy's game
- Subtract a square
- Wythoff array
