= François Charles Archile Jeanneret =

Chancellor of the University of Toronto (1890–1967)

22nd Chancellor of the University of Toronto
- In office 1959 – 1965
- President: Claude Bissell
- Preceded by: Samuel Beatty
- Succeeded by: Omond Solandt

8th Principal of University College, Toronto
- In office 1951 – 1959
- Preceded by: William Robert Taylor
- Succeeded by: Moffatt Woodside

Personal details
- Born: November 18, 1890 Elmira, Ontario, Canada
- Died: 1967 (aged 76–77)
- Education: University of Toronto; University of Chicago; University of Paris

François Charles Archile Jeanneret (November 18, 1890 – 1967) was the 22nd chancellor of the University of Toronto, holding the position from 1959 to 1965.

== Early life ==
Jeanneret was born in Elmira, Ontario, Canada on November 18, 1890. He graduated with honors from Berlin Collegiate and played on the school's soccer team, winning the Dominion Football Association championship. After high school, Jeanneret attended the University of Toronto, the University of Chicago, and finally the University of Paris in Paris, France.

== Career ==
When he completed his academic studies, he took a position as the head of the department of modern languages at Upper Canada College from 1912 to 1913, and joined the staff of the University of Toronto's University College in 1913. From 1926 to 1941, he directed the Ontario Ministry of Education's oral French course for teachers at Quebec City and was honored by Laval University. He was named an Officer d'Academie in 1940 by France, and was later awarded a medal from the French government in 1959 and the Pierre Chauveau Medal from the Royal Society of Canada. When he returned to the University of Toronto, Jeanneret took on several positions, including chairman of the university's School of Graduate Studies from 1947 to 1951, principal of University College from 1951 to 1959, and Chancellor of the University of Toronto from 1959 until his death in 1967. While Chancellor, Jeanneret also held several diplomatic posts including Canadian delegate to the Commonwealth Education Conference in Oxford, United Kingdom in 1959 and Delhi, India in 1962. Jeanneret authored fifteen textbooks during his lifetime, including French texts used in Ontario high schools, and received an honorary degree, receiving a Doctor of Letters, from the Memorial University of Newfoundland in May 1963.

Academic offices
Preceded by Samuel Beatty	Chancellor of the University of Toronto; 1959–1965	Succeeded by Omond Solandt
