= Geertruida Wijthoff =

Dutch mathematician (1859–1953)

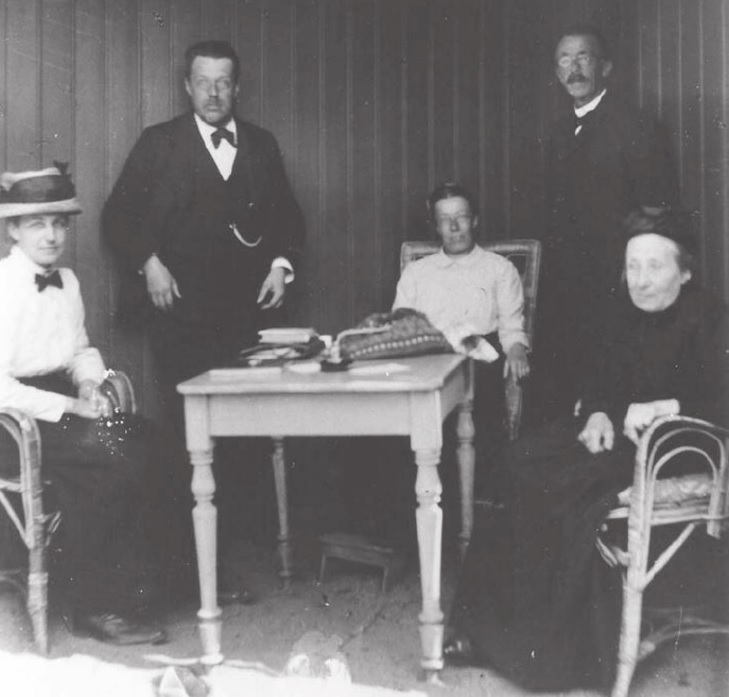
- Wijthoff (center) with (from left) Anna Catharina Wijthoff, Willem Wijthoff, Julius Kerkhoven and Anna Catharina Wijthoff-Kerkhoven
- Born: Anna Geertruida Wijthoff; 30 August 1859; Amsterdam, Netherlands
- Died: 13 March 1953 (aged 93); Apeldoorn, Netherlands
- Other name: Truida Kerkhoven
- Education: Athenaeum Illustre of Amsterdam
- Occupations: Mathematician and teacher
- Spouse: Julius Kerkhoven (m. 1898, died)
- Relatives: Willem Wijthoff (brother)

Geertruida "Truida" Wijthoff (30 August 1859 – 13 March 1953) was a Dutch mathematician and teacher. In 1907 she became a member of merit of the Royal Dutch Mathematical Society.

== Life and work ==
Truida (birthname, Anna Geertruida Wijthoff) was the eldest of four children born into the wealthy family of Abraham Willem Wijthoff and Anna Catharina Frederika Kerkhoven. Truida's father was a Lutheran and son of the Amsterdam sugar refinery family Wijthoff & Son. Truida's family first lived at Lauriergracht 111, just next to the sugar refinery that burned down in 1880. (In 1911, they moved to PC Hooftstraat 28 in Amsterdam.) Truida's younger sister was the writer Henriëtte Wijthoff and her next younger sibling was Anna Catharina Frederika Wijthoff, a painter and illustrator of children's books. The youngest child was the mathematical theorist and teacher Willem Abraham Wythoff.

In 1881, at the age of 22, Truida enrolled at the Athenaeum Illustre of Amsterdam to study mathematics and physics. She and Marie du Saar, who registered as a student in medicine that same autumn, were two of the first women to study there, preceded only by the physician Aletta Jacobs. After graduation, Truida became a teacher at the girls' school in Middelburg from 1884 to 1886. She then returned to Amsterdam to work for the Administration Office for the Management of American Railway Values, which was owned by the Amsterdam banker Wertheim.

Like her only brother, Truida was an avid solver of the problems section in the New Archive for Mathematics (NAW). After she received an honorable mention (the highest attainable prize) for the fifth time in the annual competition, she was appointed a member of merit of the Royal Dutch Mathematical Society in 1907. Even after the family moved to Apeldoorn, she won the NAW competition many more times, and in 1923 she received her tenth honorable mention.

In 1914, Truida became a member of the Apeldoorn branch of the Association against Quackery. At the end of the nineteenth century, she also became involved in the Masonic weekly, a magazine for the Order of Freemasons.

== Personal life ==
On 23 September 1898, she married her cousin Julius Kerkhoven who for 20 years, had worked as a civil engineer for Tjiandjoer and Tjilatjap on West Java in Indonesia, and in Padang and Batu Taba on Sumatra for the Dutch-Indian Railway Company. Julius was the younger brother of Rudolf Kerkhoven, the inspiration for the main character in Hella Haasse's novel De Heren van de Thee.

After her husband's death, Truida continued to live in Apeldoorn with her sister Henriëtte. She survived the other three Wijthoff children and died on 13 March 1953.
