= Muriel Kennett Wales =

Irish-Canadian mathematician

- Born: June 9, 1913; Belfast, Ireland
- Died: August 8, 2008 (aged 95); Vancouver, British Columbia, Canada
- Known for: First Irish-born woman to receive a PhD in pure mathematics

Academic background
- Education: University of British Columbia (BA, MA); University of Toronto (PhD)
- Thesis: Theory Of Algebraic Functions Based On The Use Of Cycles (1941)
- Doctoral advisor: Samuel Beatty

Muriel Kennett Wales (9 Jun 1913 – 8 August 2009) was an Irish-Canadian mathematician, and is believed to have been the first Irish-born woman to earn a PhD in pure mathematics.

== Life ==
She was born Muriel Kennett on 9 June 1913 in Belfast. In 1914, her mother moved to Vancouver, British Columbia, and soon remarried; henceforth Muriel was known by her mother's new last name, Wales.

She was first educated at the University of British Columbia (BA 1934, MA 1937 with the thesis Determination of Bases for Certain Quartic Number Fields). In 1941 she was awarded the PhD from the University of Toronto for the dissertation Theory Of Algebraic Functions Based On The Use Of Cycles under Samuel Beatty (himself the first person to receive a PhD in mathematics in Canada, in 1915).

She spent most of the 1940s working in atomic energy, in Toronto and Montreal, but by 1949 had retired back to Vancouver where she worked in her step-father's shipping company.
