= András Sárközy =

Hungarian mathematician

András Sárközy (born January 16, 1941 (age 84) in Budapest) is a Hungarian mathematician, working in analytic and combinatorial number theory, although his first works were in the fields of geometry and classical analysis. He has the largest number of papers co-authored with Paul Erdős (a total of 62); he has an Erdős number of one. He proved the Furstenberg–Sárközy theorem that every sequence of natural numbers with positive upper density contains two members whose difference is a full square. He was elected a corresponding member (1998), and a full member (2004) of the Hungarian Academy of Sciences. He received the Széchenyi Prize (2010). He is the father of the mathematician Gábor N. Sárközy.
