= Samuel Beatty (mathematician) =

Canadian mathematician

Samuel Beatty FRSC

21st Chancellor of the University of Toronto
- In office 1953 – 1959
- President: Sidney Earle Smith; Claude Bissell
- Preceded by: Vincent Massey
- Succeeded by: François Charles Archile Jeanneret

7th Dean of the University of Toronto Faculty of Arts
- In office 1936 – 1952
- Preceded by: Francis Barclay Allan
- Succeeded by: Moffat St Andrew Woodside

Personal details
- Born: 1881
- Died: 1970

Samuel Beatty FRSC (1881–1970) was dean of the Faculty of Mathematics at the University of Toronto, taking the position in 1934, and dean of the Faculty of Arts from 1936 to 1952.

== Early life ==
Beatty was born in 1881. In 1915, he graduated from the University of Toronto with a PhD and a dissertation entitled Extensions of Results Concerning the Derivatives of an Algebraic Function of a Complex Variable, with the help of his adviser, John Charles Fields. He was the first person to receive a PhD in mathematics from a Canadian university. In 1925 he was elected a Fellow of the Royal Society of Canada. In 1926, he published a problem in the American Mathematical Monthly, which formed the genesis for the Beatty sequence.

== University of Toronto ==
Beatty was dean of the Faculty of Mathematics at the University of Toronto, taking the position in 1934. The famous mathematician Richard Brauer was recruited by Beatty in 1935. He invited Harold Scott MacDonald Coxeter to the University of Toronto with a position as an assistant professor, which Coxeter took; he remained in Toronto for the rest of his life. In 1936, he was appointed the 7th dean of the Faculty of Arts, a position which he held until 1952. In June 1939, he was one of the founding members of the Committee of Teaching Staff. Beatty was appointed the 21st Chancellor of the University of Toronto in 1953, holding the position until 1959. He was associated with the university from 1911 to 1952, and a scholarship was established in his honor. He died in 1970.

In a very real sense he guided Canadian mathematics from the isolation of the 19th century to a significant role in the 20th century.

In an era when extremely few women received PhDs in mathematics, Beatty supervised the mathematical PhDs of Mary Fisher and Muriel Kennett Wales.

Nobel Prize in Chemistry winner Walter Kohn, a student at the university while Beatty was a dean, expressed his appreciation in 1998 to the dean when accepting the prize for his development of the density functional theory. In 1942, when Kohn could not access the university's chemistry buildings during World War II because of his German nationality, Beatty had helped him to enroll in the Mathematics Department at the university.

== Canadian Mathematical Society ==
Beatty was one of the founders of the Canadian Mathematical Congress and was elected to serve as the first president of the congress in 1945. Under his presidency, the Canadian Mathematical Congress began to promote mathematical development in Canada. Beatty served as the president of the Canadian Mathematical Congress until 1978 at which point the congress was renamed the Canadian Mathematical Society to avoid further confusion with the quadrennial mathematical congresses.

Academic offices
Preceded by Vincent Massey	Chancellor of the University of Toronto; 1953–1959	Succeeded by François Charles Archile Jeanneret
