= Richard Arnold Epstein =

American game theorist (1927–2016)

- Born: March 5, 1927; Los Angeles, California, U.S.
- Died: July 5, 2016 (aged 89)
- Other name: E. P. Stein
- Education: University of California, Los Angeles (BA); University of California, Berkeley; University of Barcelona (PhD)
- Known for: Game theory
- Scientific career
- Fields: Game theory
- Workplaces: Parsons-Aerojet Company; Glenn L. Martin Company; TRW; Space Technology Laboratory; JPL; Hughes Aircraft

Richard Arnold Epstein (March 5, 1927 – July 5, 2016), also known under the pseudonym E. P. Stein, was an American game theorist.

== Early life and education ==
Epstein was born in Los Angeles, California. He obtained his Bachelor of Arts degree from the University of California, Los Angeles, in 1948. He then studied at the University of California Berkeley. He received his doctorate in physics, on the Born formalization of isochromatic lines, in 1961, from the University of Barcelona.

== Career ==
He then shifted from spectroscopy to space communications, and worked for eighteen years as an electronics and communications engineer for various U.S. space and missile programs. He was variously employed by Parsons-Aerojet Company at Cape Canaveral, Glenn L. Martin Company, TRW Space Technology Laboratories, the Jet Propulsion Laboratory, and Hughes Aircraft Space Systems Division. Epstein has numerous technical publications in the areas of probability theory, statistics, game theory, and space communications. In 1956, he was made a member of the IEEE.

== Achievements ==
The Theory of Gambling and Statistical Logic ranks as the most popular of Epstein's technical books. He served as a consultant to public and private gambling casinos in Greece and Macao, and he had testified on technical aspects of gambling in several court cases.

Under the pseudonym "E. P. Stein", he authored various popular works of fiction, as well as historic and non-fictional books, and wrote for TV and motion pictures.

== Death ==
Epstein died on July 5, 2016.

== Books by Epstein ==
- Richard A. Epstein, The Theory of Gambling and Statistical Logic (revised edition), Academic Press, 1995, ISBN 0-12-240761-X. (Second edition), Academic Press, 2009, ISBN 0-12-374940-9.

== Selected journal publications by Epstein ==
- Richard A. Epstein, "An automatic synchronization technique," IEEE Transactions on Communication Technology, Vol. 13(4), pp. 547–550, 1965.
- Richard A. Epstein, "Relative coverage of large ground antennas," IEEE Transactions on Space Electronics and Telemetry, Vol. 10(1), pp. 31–83, 1964.

== Popular works under the pseudonym E. P. Stein ==
- Anna K. Brando and E. P. Stein, Brando for Breakfast, Berkley Pub Group, 1980, ISBN 0-425-04698-2.
- E. P. Stein, Flight of the Vin Fiz, Arbor House, 1985, ISBN 0-87795-672-3.

== See also ==
- Subtract a square, a mathematical game invented by Epstein
