= Beatty sequence =

Integers formed by rounding down the integer multiples of a positive irrational number

In mathematics, a Beatty sequence (or homogeneous Beatty sequence) is the sequence of integers found by taking the floor of the positive multiples of an irrational number that is greater than one. Beatty sequences are named after Samuel Beatty, who wrote about them in 1926.

Rayleigh's theorem, named after Lord Rayleigh, states that the complement of a Beatty sequence, consisting of the positive integers that are not in the sequence, is itself a Beatty sequence generated by a different irrational number.

Beatty sequences can also be used to generate Sturmian words.

== Definition ==
Any irrational number $r$ that is greater than one generates the Beatty sequence
$$\mathcal{B}_r = \bigl\{ \lfloor r \rfloor, \lfloor 2r \rfloor, \lfloor 3r \rfloor,\ldots \bigr\}$$
The two irrational numbers $r$ and $s = r/(r-1)$ naturally satisfy the equation $1/r + 1/s = 1$. The two Beatty sequences $\mathcal{B}_r$ and $\mathcal{B}_s$ that they generate form a pair of complementary Beatty sequences. Here, "complementary" means that every positive integer belongs to exactly one of these two sequences.

== Examples ==
When $r$ is the golden ratio $r=(1+\sqrt5)/2\approx 1.618$, the sequence of integer multiples of $r$ have the approximate values

1.618, 3.236, 4.854, 6.472, 8.090, 9.708, ...

Rounding these numbers down to integers gives the sequence $( \lfloor nr \rfloor)$, known as the lower Wythoff sequence, which is

1, 3, 4, 6, 8, 9, 11, 12, 14, 16, 17, 19, 21, 22, 24, 25, 27, 29, ... (sequence A000201 in the OEIS).

In this case, the complementary Beatty sequence is generated by
$$s=\frac{r}{r-1}=\frac{(1+\sqrt5)/2}{(-1+\sqrt5)/2}=\frac{3+\sqrt5}{2}\approx 2.618.$$
Its integer multiples have the approximate values

2.618, 5.236, 7.854, 10.472, 13.090, 15.708, ...

Rounding these values down to integers $( \lfloor ns \rfloor)$ produces the upper Wythoff sequence,

2, 5, 7, 10, 13, 15, 18, 20, 23, 26, 28, 31, 34, 36, 39, 41, 44, 47, ... (sequence A001950 in the OEIS).

Every positive integer is in exactly one of these two sequences. These sequences define the optimal strategy for Wythoff's game, and are used in the definition of the Wythoff array.

As another example, for the square root of 2, $r=\sqrt2\approx 1.414$, and $s=\sqrt2/(\sqrt2-1)=2+\sqrt2\approx 3.414$. In this case, the sequences are

1, 2, 4, 5, 7, 8, 9, 11, 12, 14, 15, 16, 18, 19, 21, 22, 24, ... (sequence A001951 in the OEIS), and
3, 6, 10, 13, 17, 20, 23, 27, 30, 34, 37, 40, 44, 47, 51, 54, 58, ... (sequence A001952 in the OEIS).

For $r=\pi\approx 3.142$ and $s=\pi/(\pi-1)\approx 1.467$, the sequences are

3, 6, 9, 12, 15, 18, 21, 25, 28, 31, 34, 37, 40, 43, 47, 50, 53, ... (sequence A022844 in the OEIS), and
1, 2, 4, 5, 7, 8, 10, 11, 13, 14, 16, 17, 19, 20, 22, 23, 24, 26, ... (sequence A054386 in the OEIS).

Any number in the first sequence is absent in the second, and vice versa.

== History ==
Beatty sequences got their name from the problem posed in The American Mathematical Monthly by Samuel Beatty in 1926. However, even earlier, in 1894 such sequences were briefly mentioned by Lord Rayleigh in the second edition of his book The Theory of Sound.

== Rayleigh theorem ==
Rayleigh's theorem (also known as Beatty's theorem) states that given an irrational number $r > 1 \,,$ there exists $s > 1$ so that the Beatty sequences $\mathcal{B}_r$ and $\mathcal{B}_s$ partition the set of positive integers: each positive integer belongs to exactly one of the two sequences.

=== First proof ===
Given $r > 1 \,,$ let $s = r/(r-1)$. We must show that every positive integer lies in one and only one of the two sequences $\mathcal{B}_r$ and $\mathcal{B}_s$. We shall do so by considering the ordinal positions occupied by all the fractions $j/r$ and $k/s$ when they are jointly listed in nondecreasing order for positive integers j and k.

To see that no two of the numbers can occupy the same position (as a single number), suppose to the contrary that $j/r = k/s$ for some j and k. Then $r/s$ = $j/k$, a rational number, but also, $r/s = r(1 - 1/r) = r - 1,$ not a rational number. Therefore, no two of the numbers occupy the same position.

For any $j/r$, there are $j$ positive integers $i$ such that $i/r \le j/r$ and $\lfloor js/r \rfloor$ positive integers $k$ such that $k/s \le j/r$, so that the position of $j/r$ in the list is $j + \lfloor js/r \rfloor$. The equation $1/r + 1/s = 1$ implies
$$j + \lfloor js/r \rfloor = j + \lfloor j(s - 1) \rfloor = \lfloor js \rfloor.$$

Likewise, the position of $k/s$ in the list is $\lfloor kr \rfloor$.

Conclusion: every positive integer (that is, every position in the list) is of the form $\lfloor nr \rfloor$ or of the form $\lfloor ns \rfloor$, but not both. The converse statement is also true: if p and q are two real numbers such that every positive integer occurs precisely once in the above list, then p and q are irrational and the sum of their reciprocals is 1.

=== Second proof ===
Collisions: Suppose that, contrary to the theorem, there are integers j > 0 and k and m such that
$$j = \left\lfloor {k \cdot r} \right\rfloor = \left\lfloor {m \cdot s} \right\rfloor \,.$$
This is equivalent to the inequalities
$$j \le k \cdot r < j + 1 \text{ and } j \le m \cdot s < j + 1.$$

For non-zero j, the irrationality of r and s is incompatible with equality, so
$$j < k \cdot r < j + 1 \text{ and } j < m \cdot s < j + 1,$$
which leads to
$${j \over r} < k < {j + 1 \over r} \text{ and } {j \over s} < m < {j + 1 \over s}.$$

Adding these together and using the hypothesis, we get
$$j < k + m < j + 1$$
which is impossible (one cannot have an integer between two adjacent integers). Thus the supposition must be false.

Anti-collisions: Suppose that, contrary to the theorem, there are integers j > 0 and k and m such that
$$k \cdot r < j \text{ and } j + 1 \le (k + 1) \cdot r \text{ and } m \cdot s < j \text{ and } j + 1 \le (m + 1) \cdot s \,.$$

Since j + 1 is non-zero and r and s are irrational, we can exclude equality, so
$$k \cdot r < j \text{ and } j + 1 < (k + 1) \cdot r \text{ and } m \cdot s < j \text{ and } j + 1 < (m + 1) \cdot s.$$

Then we get
$$k < {j \over r} \text{ and } {j + 1 \over r} < k + 1 \text{ and } m < {j \over s} \text{ and } {j + 1 \over s} < m + 1$$

Adding corresponding inequalities, we get
$$k + m < j \text{ and } j + 1 < k + m + 2$$
$$k + m < j < k + m + 1$$

which is also impossible. Thus the supposition is false.

== Properties ==
A number $m$ belongs to the Beatty sequence $\mathcal{B}_r$ if and only if
$$1 - \frac{1}{r} < \left[ \frac{m}{r} \right]_1$$
where $[x]_1$ denotes the fractional part of $x$ i.e., $[x]_1 = x - \lfloor x \rfloor$.

Proof: $m \in B_r$ $\Leftrightarrow \exists n, m = \lfloor nr \rfloor$ $\Leftrightarrow m < nr < m + 1$ $\Leftrightarrow \frac{m}{r} < n < \frac{m}{r} + \frac{1}{r}$ $\Leftrightarrow n - \frac{1}{r} < \frac{m}{r} < n$ $\Leftrightarrow 1 - \frac{1}{r} < \left[ \frac{m}{r} \right]_1$

Furthermore, $m = \left\lfloor \left( \left\lfloor \frac{m}{r} \right\rfloor + 1 \right) r \right\rfloor$.

Proof: $m = \left\lfloor \left( \left\lfloor \frac{m}{r} \right\rfloor + 1 \right) r \right\rfloor$ $\Leftrightarrow m < \left( \left\lfloor \frac{m}{r} \right\rfloor + 1 \right) r < m + 1$ $\Leftrightarrow \frac{m}{r} < \left\lfloor \frac{m}{r} \right\rfloor + 1 < \frac{m + 1}{r}$ $\Leftrightarrow \left\lfloor \frac{m}{r} \right\rfloor + 1 - \frac{1}{r} < \frac{m}{r} < \left\lfloor \frac{m}{r} \right\rfloor + 1$ $\Leftrightarrow 1 - \frac{1}{r} < \frac{m}{r} - \left\lfloor \frac{m}{r} \right\rfloor =\left[ \frac{m}{r} \right]_1$

=== Relation with Sturmian sequences ===
The first difference
$$\lfloor (n+1)r\rfloor-\lfloor nr\rfloor$$
of the Beatty sequence associated with the irrational number $r$ is a characteristic Sturmian word over the alphabet $\{\lfloor r\rfloor,\lfloor r\rfloor+1\}$.

== Generalizations ==
If slightly modified, the Rayleigh's theorem can be generalized to positive real numbers (not necessarily irrational) and negative integers as well: if positive real numbers $r$ and $s$ satisfy $1/r + 1/s = 1$, the sequences $( \lfloor mr \rfloor)_{m \in \mathbb{Z}}$ and $( \lceil ns \rceil -1)_{n \in \mathbb{Z}}$ form a partition of integers. For example, the white and black keys of a piano keyboard are distributed as such sequences for $r = 12/7$ and $s = 12/5$.

The Lambek–Moser theorem generalizes the Rayleigh theorem and shows that more general pairs of sequences defined from an integer function and its inverse have the same property of partitioning the integers.

Uspensky's theorem states that, if $\alpha_1,\ldots,\alpha_n$ are positive real numbers such that $(\lfloor k\alpha_i\rfloor)_{k,i\ge1}$ contains all positive integers exactly once, then $n\le2.$ That is, there is no equivalent of Rayleigh's theorem for three or more Beatty sequences.
