= Hofstadter sequence =

Any of several recursively-defined integer sequences

In mathematics, a Hofstadter sequence is a member of a family of related integer sequences defined by non-linear recurrence relations.

== Sequences presented in Gödel, Escher, Bach: an Eternal Golden Braid ==
The first Hofstadter sequences were described by Douglas Richard Hofstadter in his book Gödel, Escher, Bach. In order of their presentation in chapter III on figures and background (Figure-Figure sequence) and chapter V on recursive structures and processes (remaining sequences), these sequences are:

=== Hofstadter Figure-Figure sequences ===
The Hofstadter Figure-Figure (R and S) sequences are a pair of complementary integer sequences defined as follows:

$$\begin{align}
R(1) &= 1,\ S(1) = 2; \\
R(n) &= R(n - 1) + S(n - 1), \quad n > 1,
\end{align}$$

with the sequence $S(n)$ defined as a strictly increasing series of positive integers not present in $R(n)$. The first few terms of these sequences are

R: 1, 3, 7, 12, 18, 26, 35, 45, 56, 69, 83, 98, 114, 131, 150, 170, 191, 213, 236, 260, ... (sequence A005228 in the OEIS)
S: 2, 4, 5, 6, 8, 9, 10, 11, 13, 14, 15, 16, 17, 19, 20, 21, 22, 23, 24, 25, ... (sequence A030124 in the OEIS)

=== Hofstadter G sequence ===
The Hofstadter G sequence is defined as follows:

$$\begin{align}
G(0)& = 0, \\
G(n)& = n - G\big(G(n - 1)\big), \quad n > 0.
\end{align}$$

The first few terms of this sequence are

0, 1, 1, 2, 3, 3, 4, 4, 5, 6, 6, 7, 8, 8, 9, 9, 10, 11, 11, 12, 12, ... (sequence A005206 in the OEIS)

=== Hofstadter H sequence ===
The Hofstadter H sequence is defined as follows:

$$\begin{align}
H(0) &= 0, \\
H(n) &= n - H\Big(H\big(H(n - 1)\big)\Big), \quad n > 0.
\end{align}$$

The first few terms of this sequence are

0, 1, 1, 2, 3, 4, 4, 5, 5, 6, 7, 7, 8, 9, 10, 10, 11, 12, 13, 13, 14, ... (sequence A005374 in the OEIS)

=== Hofstadter Female and Male sequences ===
The Hofstadter Female (F) and Male (M) sequences are defined as follows:

$$\begin{align}
F(0) &= 1,\ M(0) = 0; \\
F(n) &= n - M\big(F(n - 1)\big), \quad n > 0, \\
M(n) &= n - F\big(M(n - 1)\big), \quad n > 0.
\end{align}$$

The first few terms of these sequences are

F: 1, 1, 2, 2, 3, 3, 4, 5, 5, 6, 6, 7, 8, 8, 9, 9, 10, 11, 11, 12, 13, ... (sequence A005378 in the OEIS)
M: 0, 0, 1, 2, 2, 3, 4, 4, 5, 6, 6, 7, 7, 8, 9, 9, 10, 11, 11, 12, 12, ... (sequence A005379 in the OEIS)

=== Hofstadter Q sequence ===
The Hofstadter Q sequence is defined as follows:

$$\begin{align}
Q(1) &= Q(2) = 1, \\
Q(n) &= Q\big(n - Q(n - 1)\big) + Q\big(n - Q(n - 2)\big), \quad n > 2.
\end{align}$$

The first few terms of the sequence are

1, 1, 2, 3, 3, 4, 5, 5, 6, 6, 6, 8, 8, 8, 10, 9, 10, 11, 11, 12, ... (sequence A005185 in the OEIS)

Hofstadter named the terms of the sequence "Q numbers"; thus the Q number of 6 is 4. The presentation of the Q sequence in Hofstadter's book is actually the first known mention of a meta-Fibonacci sequence in literature.

While the terms of the Fibonacci sequence are determined by summing the two preceding terms, the two preceding terms of a Q number determine how far to go back in the Q sequence to find the two terms to be summed. The indices of the summation terms thus depend on the Q sequence itself.

Q(1), the first element of the sequence, is never one of the two terms being added to produce a later element; it is involved only within an index in the calculation of Q(3).

Although the terms of the Q sequence seem to flow chaotically, like many meta-Fibonacci sequences, its terms can be grouped into blocks of successive generations. In case of the Q sequence, the k-th generation has 2^{k} members. Furthermore, with g being the generation that a Q number belongs to, the two terms to be summed to calculate the Q number, called its parents, reside by far mostly in generation g − 1 and only a few in generation g − 2, but never in an even older generation.

Most of these findings are empirical observations, since virtually nothing has been proved about the Q sequence so far. It is specifically unknown whether the sequence is well-defined for all n; that is, whether the sequence "dies" at some point because its generation rule tries to refer to terms which would conceptually sit left of the first term Q(1).

== Generalizations of the Q sequence ==
=== Hofstadter–Huber Q_{r,s}(n) family ===
20 years after Hofstadter first described the Q sequence, he and Greg Huber used the character Q to name the generalization of the Q sequence toward a family of sequences, and renamed the original Q sequence of his book to U sequence.

The original Q sequence is generalized by replacing n − 1 and n − 2 by n − r and n − s, respectively.

This leads to the sequence family

$$Q_{r,s}(n) = \begin{cases}
1 , \quad 1 \le n \le s, \\
Q_{r,s}(n-Q_{r,s}(n-r))+Q_{r,s}(n-Q_{r,s}(n-s)), \quad n > s,
\end{cases}$$

where s ≥ 2 and r < s.

With (r,s) = (1,2), the original Q sequence is a member of this family. So far, only three sequences of the family Q_{r,s} are known, namely the U sequence with (r,s) = (1,2) (which is the original Q sequence); the V sequence with (r,s) = (1,4); and the W sequence with (r,s) = (2,4). Only the V sequence, which does not behave as chaotically as the others, is proven not to "die". Similar to the original Q sequence, virtually nothing has been proved rigorously about the W sequence to date.

The first few terms of the V sequence are

1, 1, 1, 1, 2, 3, 4, 5, 5, 6, 6, 7, 8, 8, 9, 9, 10, 11, 11, 11, ... (sequence A063882 in the OEIS)

The first few terms of the W sequence are

1, 1, 1, 1, 2, 4, 6, 7, 7, 5, 3, 8, 9, 11, 12, 9, 9, 13, 11, 9, ... (sequence A087777 in the OEIS)

For other values (r,s) the sequences sooner or later "die" i.e. there exists an n for which Q_{r,s}(n) is undefined because n − Q_{r,s}(n − r) < 1.

=== Pinn F_{i,j}(n) family ===
In 1998, Klaus Pinn, scientist at University of Münster (Germany) and in close communication with Hofstadter, suggested another generalization of Hofstadter's Q sequence which Pinn called F sequences.

The family of Pinn F_{i,j} sequences is defined as follows:

$$F_{i,j}(n) =
\begin{cases}
1 , \quad n=1,2, \\
F_{i,j}(n-i-F_{i,j}(n-1))+F_{i,j}(n-j-F_{i,j}(n-2)), \quad n > 2.
\end{cases}$$

Thus Pinn introduced additional constants i and j which shift the index of the terms of the summation conceptually to the left (that is, closer to start of the sequence).

Only F sequences with (i,j) = (0,0), (0,1), (1,0), and (1,1), the first of which represents the original Q sequence, appear to be well-defined. Unlike Q(1), the first elements of the Pinn F_{i,j}(n) sequences are terms of summations in calculating later elements of the sequences when any of the additional constants is 1.

The first few terms of the Pinn F_{0,1} sequence are

1, 1, 2, 2, 3, 4, 4, 4, 5, 6, 6, 7, 8, 8, 8, 8, 9, 10, 10, 11, ... (sequence A046699 in the OEIS)

== Hofstadter–Conway $10,000 sequence ==
The Hofstadter–Conway $10,000 sequence is defined as follows
$$\begin{align}
a(1) &= a(2) = 1, \\
a(n) &= a\big(a(n - 1)\big) + a\big(n - a(n - 1)\big), \quad n > 2.
\end{align}$$

The first few terms of this sequence are

1, 1, 2, 2, 3, 4, 4, 4, 5, 6, 7, 7, 8, 8, 8, 8, 9, 10, 11, 12, ... (sequence A004001 in the OEIS)

The values $a(n)/n$ converge to 1/2, and this sequence acquired its name because John Horton Conway offered a prize of $10,000 to anyone who could determine its rate of convergence. The prize, since reduced to $1,000, was claimed by Colin L. Mallows, who proved that
$$\left|\frac{a(n)}{n} - \frac{1}{2}\right| = O\!\left(\frac{1}{\sqrt{\log n}}\right).$$
In private communication with Klaus Pinn, Hofstadter later claimed that he had found the sequence and its structure about 10–15 years before Conway posed his challenge.
