= List of abstract strategy games =

An abstract strategy game is a board, card or other game where gameplay is mostly without a theme and a player's decisions affect the outcome. Abstract strategy games are combinatorial, i.e. they provide perfect information (instead of hidden or imperfect information), rely on neither physical dexterity nor non-deterministic elements (such as shuffled cards or dice rolls) during gameplay. Some board games which do not rely on the removal or movement of pieces can also be played as pen-and-paper games. Almost all abstract strategy games are designed for two players or teams taking a finite number of alternating turns.

== Chess and chess-like games ==
- Apocalypse (1976)
- Arimaa (2002)
- Chaturaji (India) (~1000–1200)
- Chaturanga (Indian chess) (~6th century)
- Chess (Western chess) (~15th century modern form)
- Congo (1982)
- Courier chess (German chess) (~12th century)
- Crazyhouse (1993)
- Dameo (2000)
- Djambi (modern French chess variant) (1975)
- Duell (1976)
- Fortress chess (Russia) (~18th century)
- Four-handed chess (~19th century)
- Game of the Generals (1970)
- Gess (1994)
- Grande Acedrex (Spanish chess) (~13th century)
- Hexagonal chess (1936)
- Hnefatafl (Nordic chess-like game) (~4th–11th century)
- Hiashatar (Mongolian chess variant) (~17th century)
- Hive (boardless chess-like game with tiles) (2001)
- Infinite chess (2012)
- Janggi (Korean chess) (~16th century)
- Jeson Mor (Mongolian chess variant) (~17th century)
- Ko Shogi (Shogi Variant based on xiangqi and go) (1997)
- Kruzno (1992)
- Maharajah and the Sepoys (Indian chess variant) (1906)
- Makruk (Thai chess) (~16th century)
- Martian chess (for two to six players)
- Ploy (1970)
- Rithmomachia (also known as rithmomachy, arithmomachia, rythmomachy, rhythmomachy, the philosophers' game
- Rollerball (chess variant) (1998)
- Senterej (Ethiopian chess) (~16th century)
- Shatar (Mongolian chess) (~17th century)
- Shatra (Altai region of Siberia) (~18th century)
- Shatranj (Persian and Arabian chess) (~6th–7th century)
- Shogi (Japanese chess) (~11th century modern form)
- Shogi variants (other shogi-like games) (various periods)
- Sittuyin (Burmese chess) (~16th century)
- Suffragetto (Suffragettes vs. Police) (1909)
- Tamerlane chess (Persian) (~14th–15th century)
- Three-player chess (~19th century)
- Xiangqi (Chinese chess) (~10th century)

== Paper and pencil games ==
- Arithmetic progression game
- Box-making game
- Bulls and cows
- Clique game
- Col
- Dots and boxes (19th century)
- Ghost
- Hackenbush (1982)
- Icosian game (1857)
- Join five
- Jotto (1955)
- Kropki
- Labyrinth
- Notakto
- Order and Chaos (1981)
- Paper soccer
- Phutball (1982)
- Racetrack
- Sim (1969)
- Spellbinder
- Snort (1970s)
- SOS
- Sprouts (1967)
- Superghost, also known as Lexicant
- Tennis
- Triangle game
- Waiter-Client game (Picker-Chooser game)
- Word ladder (1877)

== "N-in-a-row" games ==
N-in-a-row games involve placing and/or moving pieces on a game board attempting to create a layout of N pieces in a straight line (often N=3, but not always). Positional games involve only playing pieces, with no movement or captures afterwards. Many of these positional games can also be played as paper and pencil games, and these are marked †. (Generally, 3D games are difficult to play on paper.)

Positional "N-in-a-row" games

- Connect Four † (1974)
- Connect 4x4
- Connect6 †
- Gobblet (2003)
- Gomoku † (ancient)
- Grinder (ancient)
- Hijara †
- Join five (also known as Morpion solitaire, Cross 'n' lines, Line game) †
- Quarto (1991)
- Qubic (1953)
- Renju † (1899)
- Rhumb Line †
- Score four
- Quantum tic-tac-toe (2006)
- Tic-tac-toe † (also known as Noughts and crosses) (ancient)
- Ultimate tic-tac-toe †
- YINSH (part of the GIPF project, listed below) (2003)

Non-positional "N-in-a-row" games, i.e. games with movements and/or captures

- Achi (traditional)
- Boku
- Check lines
- Dala (traditional)
- Dara (traditional)
- Kamisado (2008)
- Morabaraba (traditional)
- Morris – three, six and nine men's morris (ancient)
- Nine holes (traditional)
- Pentago (2005)
- Pente, a slight simplification of Ninuki-renju (1977)
- Picaria (traditional)
- Shax (traditional)
- Shisima (traditional)
- Square chess
- Tant Fant
- Tapatan (traditional)
- Teeko (1945)
- Tsoro yematatu (traditional)
- Wali (traditional)
- YINSH (part of the GIPF project, listed below) (2003)

== Blockade games ==
Blockade games primarily involve moving your pieces, following the game rules, so as to block your opponent from having any move they can make. In symmetric blockade games, both players have the same number of pieces with the same movement capabilities. In asymmetric blockade games, players have different numbers of pieces with different movement capabilities—usually one player having a single piece of greater movement range and the other player having multiple pieces of lesser movement capabilities.

Symmetric blockade games

- Amazons (1988)
- Grinder (ancient)
- Mlýnek (ancient)
- Mū tōrere (traditional)
- Pong Hau K'i (also known as Sua tok tong, umul gonu, gang gonu or do-guti) (traditional)
- Toads and Frogs (1982)

Asymmetric blockade games

- Bear games (ancient)
- Fox and hounds (medieval)
- Hare games (medieval)
- Koti keliya (traditional)

== Connection games ==
A connection game is a type of abstract strategy game in which players attempt to complete a specific type of connection with their pieces. This could involve forming a path between two or more goals, completing a closed loop, or connecting all of one's pieces so they are adjacent to each other. Those marked † can also be played as paper and pencil games.

- Bridg-It, also called Gale † (1958)
- Crosstrack (1994)
- Dots
- Dots and boxes † (19th century)
- Fidchell, also called Gwyddbwyll (ancient)
- Gonnect (2000)
- Havannah † (1979)
- Hex † (1942)
- Onyx (1995)
- Ponte del Diavolo (2007)
- PÜNCT (2005)
- Selfo
- Shannon switching game (1957)
- Slither
- Star (1983)
- *Star † (1983)
- Tak (2016)
- Through the Desert (1998)
- Trax (1980)
- TwixT († with modified rules) (1961)
- Y † (1953)

== Stacking games ==
- Accasta
- Battle Sheep (2010)
- Death Stacks
- DVONN (part of the GIPF project, listed below)
- Emergo (1986)
- Focus (1963)
- Gounki (1998)
- Lasca (1911)
- Pylos (1994)
- Santorini (2004)
- Torres (1999)

== Annihilation games ==
Annihilation games have as a central goal the idea of capturing or eliminating all of the opponent's pieces before they can capture yours. The rules for how a capture is accomplished vary greatly. A classic example of this category is checkers. Two of the most common forms of capture are jump (one piece jumps an opponent's piece) and custodial (one piece is surrounded by two or more opponent pieces). Both "capture and remove from the board" games and "capture and convert to one of your pieces" games are included in this list.

- Agon (1842)
- Alquerque (ancient)
- Apit-sodok (traditional)
- Armenian checkers (traditional)
- Astar
- Ataxx (1990)
- Awithlaknannai Mosona (traditional)
- Bizingo
- Brax
- Butterfly
- Camelot (1887)
- Canadian checkers (traditional)
- Checkers (also known as Draughts) (ancient)
- Choko (traditional)
- Cinc camins (traditional)
- Damath (1980)
- Dablot Prejjesne (traditional)
- Daldøs (traditional)
- Dameo (2000)
- Dash-guti (traditional)
- Egara-guti (traditional)
- Fanorona (traditional)
- Four-field kono (traditional)
- Gala (traditional)
- Gol-skuish (traditional)
- High jump
- Italian Damone (traditional)
- Jungle (Dou Shou Qi, The Game of Fighting Animals) (early 1900s)
- Jul-gonu (traditional)
- Kangaroo: The Jumping Game
- Keny (traditional)
- Kharbaga (traditional)
- Kolowis Awithlaknannai (fighting serpents) (traditional)
- Kotu Ellima (traditional)
- Lau kata kati (traditional)
- Liberian Queah (traditional)
- Mak-yek (traditional)
- Meurimueng-rimueng peuet ploh or Dam-daman or Ratti-chitti-bakri (traditional)
- Ming mang (traditional)
- Peralikatuma (traditional)
- Permainan-Tabal (traditional)
- Pretwa (traditional)
- Rek, and its variant min rek chanh (traditional)
- Sáhkku (traditional)
- Seega (ancient)
- Stay Alive (1971)
- Satoel (traditional)
- Sirius
- Sixteen soldiers (also known as Cows and Leopards or Sholo Guti) (traditional)
- Surakarta (traditional)
- Terhuchu (traditional)
- Tobit
- Tuknanavuhpi (traditional)
- Tukvnanawopi (traditional)
- Turkish draughts (traditional)
- Watermelon chess (traditional)
- Yoté (traditional)
- Zamma (traditional)

== Counting games ==
These games involve some aspect of counting, especially to determine the relative outcomes of various alternatives at points along the way. Classic examples of this category include the various Mancala games.

- Chopsticks
- Fibonacci nim
- Kalah
- Mancala and related games
- Nim †
- Parity game
- Quod †
- Subtract a square

== Positional games ==
Positional games allow no captures, but require some arrangement of pieces that constitutes a "win". This is a broad category that includes, as sub-categories, both the "All-in-a-row" games and the "Blockade" games. Only the positional games that do not fit into those two categories are included in this list.

- Abalone (1987)
- Chinese checkers (1892)
- Conspirateurs
- Diaballik (2005)
- Dodgem
- Five-field kono (traditional)
- Halma (1883)
- Hexagony
- Ingenious
- Leap Frog (board game)
- Lines of Action
- Neutron (1978)
- Reversi, also known as Othello
- Pyramid
- Salta (1899)
- Ugolki (traditional)

== Hunt games ==
In "hunting" games, one player's pieces are "hunting" the other player's pieces, so that one player is trying to capture the second player's pieces, while the second player is trying to avoid captures, arranging their pieces to surround the hunters, to be protected from the hunters, etc. A classic example of this category is Fox and Geese. These games tend to have the hunter playing a "capture" game while the prey is playing a "positional" game.

- Aadu puli attam (traditional)
- Adugo (traditional)
- Asalto (19th century)
- Bagh bandi (traditional)
- Bagha-chall (traditional)
- Buga-shadara (traditional)
- Catch the hare (also known as Cercar la liebre or Corner the rabbit) (traditional)
- Demala diviyan keliya (traditional)
- Fox games, such as fox and geese (medieval)
- Hat diviyan keliya (traditional)
- Hnefatafl (Nordic) (ancient)
- Kaooa (traditional)
- Khla si ko (traditional)
- Komikan (traditional)
- Len choa (traditional)
- Leopard hunt game (traditional)
- Len cúa kín ngoa (traditional)
- Main tapal empat (traditional)
- Meurimueng-rimueng-do (traditional)
- Meurimueng-rimueng peuet ploh (traditional)
- Pulijudam (traditional)
- Rimau (traditional)
- Rimau-rimau (traditional)
- Sher-bakar (traditional)
- Sixteen soldiers (also known as Cows and leopards or Sholo guti) (traditional)
- Sua ghin gnua (also known as Tigers and oxen) (traditional)
- Tiger and buffaloes (traditional)
- Tiger game (traditional)

== Other games ==
Those marked † can also be played as paper and pencil games.

- Aadu puli attam
- Abacus checkers
- Adugo
- Amazons
- Armenian checkers
- Asalto
- Astar
- Ataxx
- Awithlaknakwe
- Awithlaknannai Mosona
- Bagh bandi
- Bagh-chal
- Bizingo
- Blokus
- Blue and Gray
- Brax (game)
- Breakthrough
- Breakthru
- Buga-shadara
- Butterfly
- Camelot
- Canadian checkers
- Catch the hare (also known as Cercar la liebre or Corner the rabbit)
- Cathedral
- Choko
- Chomp
- Cinc camins
- Clobber
- Colonel Blotto game
- Conquest
- Conspirateurs
- Crossings
- Crosstrack
- Dablot Prejjesne
- Dash-guti
- Dawson's Kayles
- Deal Me In
- Death stacks
- Demala diviyan keliya
- Diaballik
- Diamond
- Domineering
- Dominoes
- Downfall
- Egara-guti
- En Gehé
- Entropy (1977)
- Epaminondas
- Felli
- Fetaix
- Fitchneal
- Five-field kono
- Four-field kono
- Fox games, such as fox and geese
- Game of the Generals
- Gess
- The GIPF project games:
  1. GIPF
  2. TZAAR
  3. ZÈRTZ
  4. DVONN
  5. PUNCT
  6. YINSH
  7. LYNGK
  8. TAMSK
- Go
- Gol-skuish
- Grundy's game
- Halatafl
- Halma
- Hare games
- Hare & Tortoise
- Hat diviyan keliya
- High jump
- Hive
- Hnefatafl
- Indian and jackrabbits
- Irensei
- Isola
- Italian Damone
- Jul-gonu
- Joust
- Kayles
- Kaooa
- Kensington
- Kharbaga
- Khet
- Kolowis Awithlaknannai
- Komikan
- Konane
- Kotu Ellima
- Kuzushi
- L game
- Lau kata kati
- Len Choa
- Liberian Queah
- Lotus
- Ludus latrunculorum
- Main tapal empat
- Makonn
- Meurimueng-rimueng-do
- Meurimueng-rimueng peuet ploh or Dam-daman or Ratti-chitti-bakri
- Ming mang
- Nations: A Simulation Game in International Politics
- Neutron
- Northcott's Game
- Number Scrabble
- Paddles
- Pasang
- Patterns II
- Peralikatuma
- Permainan-Tabal
- Phutball
- Ponte del Diavolo
- Pretwa
- Pulijudam
- Quoridor
- Rhumb Line
- Rhythmomachy
- Rimau
- Rimau-rimau
- Ringo
- Sher-bakar
- Sixteen soldiers (also known as "Cows and leopards" or "Sholo guti")
- So Long Sucker
- Stratego
- Sua ghin gnua (also known as "Tigers and oxen")
- Surakarta
- Sz'kwa
- Tafl games
- Tantrix
- Terhuchu
- Terrace
- Three musketeers
- Thud
- Tiger and buffaloes
- Tuknanavuhpi
- Tukvnanawopi
- Turkish draughts
- Wythoff's game
- Xoliba
- Yoté
- Zamma
