= Shatra =

Shatra may refer to:

- Paljor Dorje Shatra, a Tibetan politician.
- Shatra (game), a chess like game from the Altai region of Siberia
- Shatra (rattle), a rattle used in Altai music
- An alternate name for Ash Shatrah, a town in the Tigris-Euphrates delta of Iraq
- Shatra FC, an Iraqi football club
- Shatrovo, Bulgaria, known in Aromanian as Shatra
