= Kangaroo: The Jumping Game =

Board game

- Other names: Jump; Kangaroo
- Designers: John Flagg
- Publishers: The Flaggs, Inc.
- Publication: 1977; 48 years ago
- Genres: Abstract strategy
- Players: 2
- Playing time: 20 minutes
- Age range: 8+

Kangaroo: The Jumping Game or Kangaroo is an abstract strategy game designed by John Flagg and published by The Flaggs, Inc. in 1977. Two players move game pieces by jumping over one or more other pieces in order to eliminate those of their opponent and have the most points by the end of the game.

== Gameplay ==
Each player begins the game with two rows of pieces on their end of an 8×8 grid and take alternating turns moving a single piece. Pieces move by jumping over another–either their own or their opponent's–in any direction, which can be done if an adjacent square contains a piece and the square immediately beyond it is vacant. Similar to Checkers, players can make any number of jumps in a turn provided they are successive, and any opponent's pieces that are jumped over are removed from the board. A player can also pass their turn, but must give up a piece to do so.

The game ends when one of the following occurs: a player has no more pieces, neither player can move, or one player is unable to move. Points are awarded based on the number of remaining pieces (those that make it to the opponent's end of the board are worth double) and the player with the most points is the winner. If only one player is stuck or unable to move, then the other player makes five more moves, after which the game ends; the game continues if the stuck player finds themself able to make a move at any point during this.

== Reception ==
In a review for Games, Robert Abbott wrote that he "was impressed by the complex situations that developed from such simple rules", comparing Kangaroo to Camelot and concluding that it "provide[s] much the same flavor and enjoyment". Peter Watts, writing for Science & Vie, praised the game's mechanics and visual design and rated the game an overall score of 7/10, but noted its similarity to other abstract strategy games like Checkers and Halma. Jeux & Stratégie noted that the rules are simple and clear and praised both the strategy and presentation, but described Kangaroo as unoriginal and rated their love of the game their lowest score of 1/3 hearts.
