= Liberian Queah =

Liberian board game

An example Liberian Queah board

Liberian Queah is a two-player abstract strategy game from Liberia. It is specifically from the Gio tribe. The game is played on a slanted or diagonal square board with only 13 spaces. Pieces move "orthogonally" along these slanted or diagonal square boards. Another unique feature is that each player must have maximum four pieces on the board. Player's captured piece may resupplied with a piece from their reserve (unless of course the player has no more pieces to resupply with).

The game is somewhat related to draughts, Alquerque, Yote, and Choko. Pieces are captured by the short leap. It is specifically related to Yote and Choko in that pieces are dropped on the board. However, there is no removal of an additional enemy piece when a player captures an enemy piece. Liberian Queah could be considered a "game isolate". It cannot truly be classified with any other game.

The game is also known as Queah. It is uncertain if an official name from the Queah tribe or Liberia exist.

== History ==
The game was recorded by Johann Büttikofer in his "Travel Sketches from Liberia" in the end of 19th century. Rules were not given in much details. For example the rule of resupplying is simply given as "The person who loses a stick replaces it with another one until his supply is exhausted." This led to different interpretations on when exactly the piece should be resupplied. Also it is not stated whether the capture is mandatory or not.

== Goal ==
A player wins when they capture all of their opponent's pieces.

== Equipment ==
A 13 space slanted or diagonal square board is used. Each player has 10 pieces each. One plays the black pieces, and the other plays the white pieces.

== Game play and rules ==
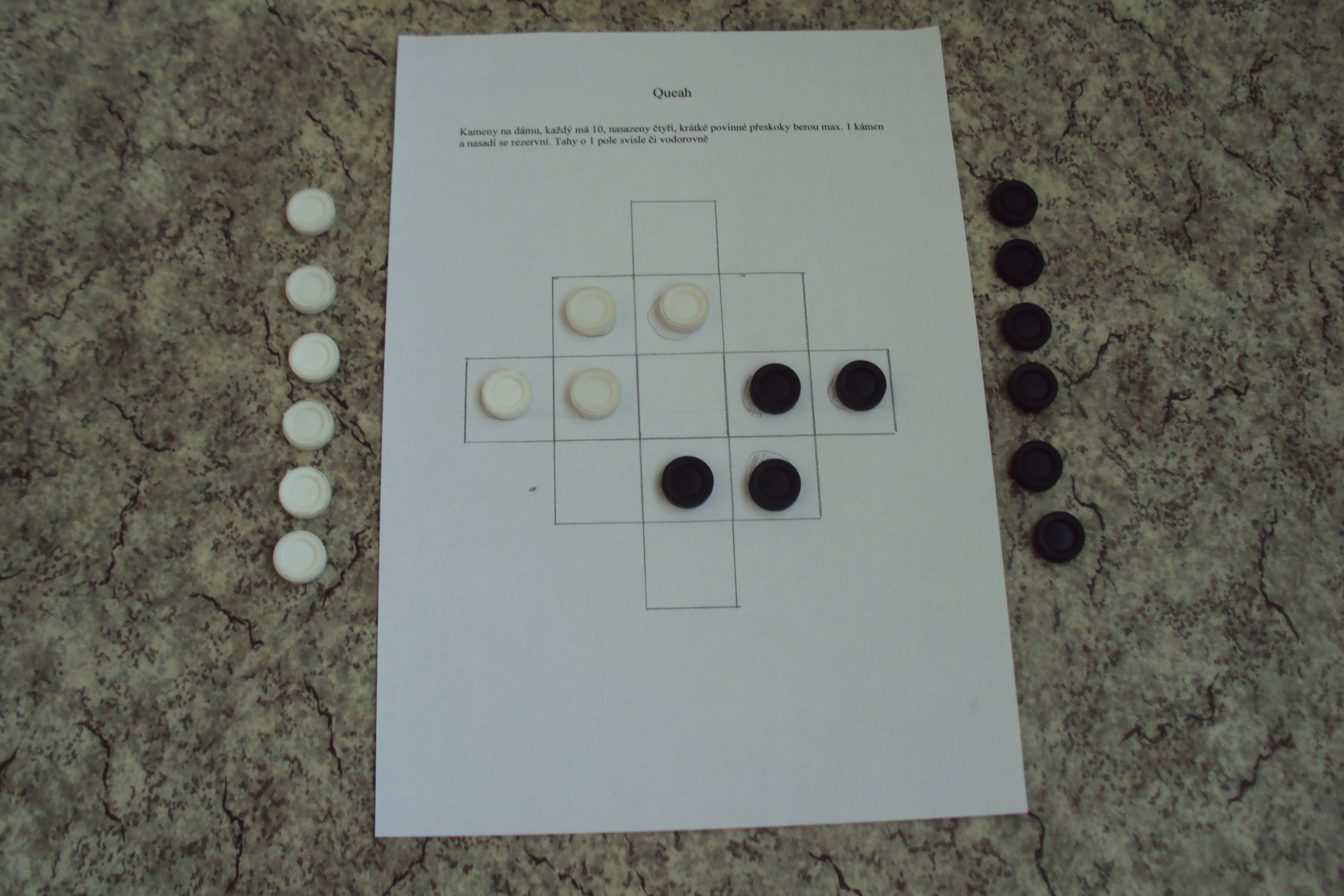
The starting conditions for Liberian Queah

1. Players decide what colors to play, and who starts first.

2. Players initially place four of their pieces on the four squares nearest them and to their right. Each player's remaining six pieces are set aside next to the board.

3. Players alternate their turns. Only one piece may be moved or used to capture an enemy piece per turn.

4. A piece moves one space per turn orthogonally along the slanted or diagonal square board onto a vacant space.

5. A player's piece can capture an enemy piece by the short leap. The player's piece must be adjacent to the enemy piece, and land on a vacant space on the other side. The capture must be done in an orthogonal direction following the slanted or diagonal design of the board. Only one enemy piece can be captured per turn. A captured piece is removed from the board.

6. If a player's piece has been captured, then the player at the beginning of their next turn must take one piece from their reserve, and drop it on any vacant space. A player's number of pieces on the board must always be restored to four, unless of course the player has exhausted their reserve. Please note though, that a player can only drop a piece from their reserve, if one of their pieces was captured on the opponent's last turn.

== Variations ==
Due to ambiguity of the rules from the original source "Travel Sketches from Liberia", it is possible to interpret the rules differently.

It is possible that it was not mandatory to resupply captured piece from the reserve before the move and it could be done instead of the move, which is similar to other games played in Africa.

== Related games ==
- Draughts
- Alquerque
- Yote
- Choko
