= Ming Mang =

Ming Mang may refer to:

- Minh Mạng, second emperor of Vietnam
- Ming mang (game), Tibetan strategy game

== See also ==
- Minhang, Shanghai
