= Quod =

Quod may refer to:

- The Quod, a contemporary nickname for the English Quota System during the Napoleonic Wars
- a quod, the main playing item in the fictional sport of Quodpot in the Harry Potter universe
- Quod (board game), an abstract strategy game

The word is also common in several Latin phrases used in different (English) contexts:

- per quod
- ad quod damnum
- nemo dat quod non habet
- quod erat demonstrandum (often abbreviated "Q.E.D.")
