= High jump (disambiguation) =

The high jump is a field event in athletics.

High jump, High Jump, or highjump may also refer to:

== Arts, entertainment, and media ==
- High Jump (film), a 1959 British film
- High jump (game), two-player strategy boardgame from Somalia
- Highjump (Transformers), a member of the Micromasters

== Military expedition ==
- Operation Highjump, 1946–7 U.S. Navy expedition to the Antarctic

== Sports ==
- Puissance, high jump competition in showjumping
- The high jump event in freestyle skating and the similar free jump in the same sport

== See also ==
- High diving
- Category:Suicides by jumping
