= Ming mang (game) =

Abstract strategy board game for two players

Position: a8 white circle, b8 black circle, c8 black circle, d8 black circle, e8 black circle, f8 black circle, g8 black circle, h8 black circle, a7 white circle, h7 black circle, a6 white circle, h6 black circle, a5 white circle, h5 black circle, a4 white circle, h4 black circle, a3 white circle, h3 black circle, a2 white circle, h2 black circle, a1 white circle, b1 white circle, c1 white circle, d1 white circle, e1 white circle, f1 white circle, g1 white circle, h1 black circle

Starting positions for Ming mang

Ming mang (Tibetan: མིག་མངས, Wylie: mig mangs) is a two-player abstract strategy board game from Tibet. Ming mang is also a general term for the word "board game" in Tibet. The correct name and spelling of the game may actually be Mig mang(s) (or Mig-Mang(s)), but pronounced Ming mang or Mi Mang. The term mig mang is also applied to Tibetan go with both games using exactly the same board which is a 17 x 17 square board, and black and white pieces. Mig is in reference to the chart (the pattern of horizontal and vertical lines) of the board, and Mangs refers to the notion that the more charts are used on the board, the more pieces are needed to play the game, but some state that it means "many eyes". The game may also be known as Gundru (or Gun-dru). The game was popular among some Tibetan monks before the Chinese invasion of Tibet in 1950, and the uprising in 1959, and among aristocratic families.

Tibetans in their diaspora have had to make use of whatever board was available be it a 19 x 19 Go board, or an 8 x 8 checkered board from draughts or checkers and orthodox chess. It is also played on other sized square boards.

Mig mang utilizes custodian capture of enemy pieces or a line of enemy pieces, and the captured pieces are replaced with the pieces of the player performing the capture(s); it thus resembles the games of Reversi and Othello in these respects. Each player's pieces are initially situated on two adjacent sides of the board (see diagram), and move orthogonally any number of unoccupied spaces like the rook in chess. It is an elimination game, as the objective is to capture all of the opponent's pieces. As such the game resembles jul-gonu, hasami shogi, dai hasami shogi, mak-yek, apit-sodok, rek, seega, ludus latrunculorum, and petteia. The game also bears some resemblance to Go, baduk, and weiqi since mig mang uses the same 17 x 17 square board as Tibetan go which is related to the other three games, and mig mang is often played with Go's 19 x 19 square board (although other board sizes are also used); custodian capture is somewhat related to the capture method in Go, as both methods surround or outflank enemy pieces in capturing them. Other games that might be comparable are ataxx and its variant hexxagōn, as these two games capture enemy pieces by placing pieces adjacent to them and converting them into their own pieces.

A work by a Tibetan woman, Rin-chen Lha-mo, We Tibetans (1926) describes a possible variation of the mig mang rules which have been interpreted to include captures of a piece or a group of pieces that turn perpendicularly such as around corners of the board, which are generally difficult to capture using the regular custodian method; moreover, she states that when one of the players has only one piece left, it develops the additional power to leap over the other player's pieces and capture them as in draughts or Alquerque.

== Setup ==
The game is played on an n x n square board, but traditionally it was played on a 17×17 square board. But varying board sizes are played with including the 8×8 square board depicted in the diagram, and it's this 8×8 square board that will be described here-in-forth with respect to the setup and rules. To start the game, each player needs 14 pieces on the board. However, each player has an additional 14 pieces in order to replace captured enemy pieces on the board. One player plays the white pieces and the other plays the black pieces, however, any two colors are appropriate.

Instead of an additional 14 pieces per player, pieces with one side white and the other side black can be used similar to those used in Reversi and Othello, that way captured pieces are simply turned over to the colors of the player who performed the capture.

Players decide what colored pieces to play, and who will start first.

The game starts with each player's 14 pieces lined up on two adjacent sides of the board as depicted on the diagram. Each player's remaining 14 pieces are set beside the board as their respective stockpile.

== Rules ==
- Players alternate their turns. Each player moves only one piece per turn.
- A piece is moved orthogonally any number of unoccupied spaces. The moves are identical to the rook in chess or the pieces in tafl.
- A player is not allowed to move a piece that brings the game back to a previous position.
- Capture of an enemy piece or a line of enemy pieces is done by the custodian method (also known as interception), and this must be created by the player performing the capture on his or her turn. The player's piece moves adjacently next to an enemy piece or line of enemy pieces that are already flanked on the other side by a friendly piece. All these pieces must be in the same row or column with no vacant space between any of them.
- Captured enemy pieces are removed at the end of the turn, each immediately replaced by one of the captor's pieces from their stock pile.
- A player is allowed to move a piece between two of the enemy's pieces on a row or column (with no vacant space between any of them) without being captured, since the enemy did not create the custodian capture on their turn. One of the enemy pieces must move away, and then return to the same position to capture the sandwiched piece if the opportunity is still available.
  - Similarly, a player is allowed to move a piece next to a line of friendly pieces which together as a group are flanked on two opposite sides by enemy pieces on a row or column (with no vacant space between any of them) without any of them being captured, since the enemy did not create the custodian capture on their turn. One of the enemy pieces must move away, and then return to the same position to capture the sandwiched pieces if the opportunity is still available.
- Multiple custodian captures can be performed in one turn. There are three general cases that exist:
  - A player moves their piece between two enemy pieces (or between two lines of enemy pieces) which are flanked on their respective opposite sides by a friendly piece (all of these pieces being on the same row or column with no space between any of them), this is cause for the capture of the enemy pieces. In this case, two custodian captures were performed but on one row or column only.
  - A player moves their piece between two enemy pieces (or between two lines of enemy pieces) in such a way that one of the enemy pieces (or one of the lines of enemy pieces) is on the same row, and the other enemy piece (or the other line of enemy pieces) is on the same column, and that each enemy piece (or each of the two lines of enemy pieces) is flanked on the other side by a friendly piece of the same row or column respectively (with no vacant space between any of them), this is cause for the capture of the two enemy pieces (or of the two lines of enemy pieces). In this case, two custodian captures were performed but one was on a row, and the other was on a column.
  - A player moves their piece between three enemy pieces (or between three lines of enemy pieces) in such a way that two of the enemy pieces (or two lines of enemy pieces) are on the same row (or column), and the third enemy piece (or third line of enemy pieces) is on the same column (or row), and that each enemy piece (each of the three lines of enemy pieces) is flanked on the other side by a friendly piece of the same row or column respectively (with no vacant space between any of them), this is cause for the capture of the three enemy pieces (or of the three lines of enemy pieces). In this case, three custodian captures were performed but two were on a row (or column), and the other was on a column (or row).
- A player wins if he or she captures all of their opponent's pieces, or stalemates their opponent's pieces by not allowing them to move on their turn.

== Other rules ==
- In Rin-chen Lha-mo's work We Tibetans (1926), she states that "The longer the sequence you can [capture] . . . the better and the sequence is not broken by going around a corner, thus:". This has been interpreted to mean that it may be possible to capture a corner piece, or a line(s) of pieces that occupy a portion of two adjacent sides of the board (hence at most one corner piece) by flanking them on two opposite ends provided there is no vacant space between any of the pieces, and Rin-cen Lha-mo actually provides an illustration showing just that. This rule is useful because it's generally difficult to perform these types of captures using the regular custodian method. However, some critics have debated whether this rule can be applied to any position on the board, or just with corner pieces. Rin-chen Lha-mo does however specifically state "...going around a corner...", and provides an illustrative example of pieces strictly going around a corner of the board. Lastly, Rin-chen Lha-mo does not specify whether or not the two pieces used to flank the captured pieces must occupy the same two adjacent sides that the captured pieces are occupying, although based upon the illustrative example she gave, she may have been attempting to suggest that. For example, in the beginning of the game, can one player attempt to capture the other player's 14 pieces as it is initially laid out using this modified custodian method? She also does not specify if (any of) the two pieces can be corner pieces (but opposite one another on the board if both are corner pieces) since these two corner pieces would not only occupy the same adjacent sides of the captured pieces, but also the remaining two other sides.
- Rin-chen Lha-mo also states that when a player has only one piece left, then ". . . this acquires the additional power of taking pieces by hopping as in draughts, so that, to prevent this, it has to be closed in on each side by two pieces instead of one: it is thus possible to win, even when reduced to this desperate position, but of course most unlikely." The piece likely can perform captures using the short leap along an orthogonal direction, although she does not clarify if captures are compulsory or if multiple leaps and captures can be performed in a single turn.

== Strategy and concepts ==
As a player continues to capture more enemy pieces, he or she is also amassing more pieces (that he or she can use) since captured enemy pieces are replaced with the player's pieces from their stockpile.
