= Hijara =

Board game

Hijara (board game)
- Designers: Martin H. Samuel
- Illustrators: Martin H. Samuel
- Publishers: Games Above Board Great American Trading Company Sterling Games
- Players: 2
- Setup time: 1 minute
- Playing time: 35 minutes
- Age range: 10 and up
- Skills: Tactics, strategy, concentration.

Hijara is a two-player abstract strategy board game played with small stones. It has been likened to a three-dimensional game on a two-dimensional board.

The game was designed by Martin H. Samuel and first printed, as Excel, by American Airlines in their inflight magazine, American Way, on December 24, 1985 and July 22, 1986. It has been sold commercially as Eclipse in 1994, and Hijara (the Arabic word for small stones) in 1995, 2003 and 2006.

Hijara II is a 50-page note pad travel version played with a blue and a yellow pen.

== Components ==
- Numbered game board
- 35 yellow sun and 35 blue moon small glass stones (extra stones are provided for each player)
- Velour pouch
- Instructions

== Objective ==
The goal of the game is, to score the most points by placing your small stones on the board - building and/or blocking point-scoring combinations.

== Gameplay ==
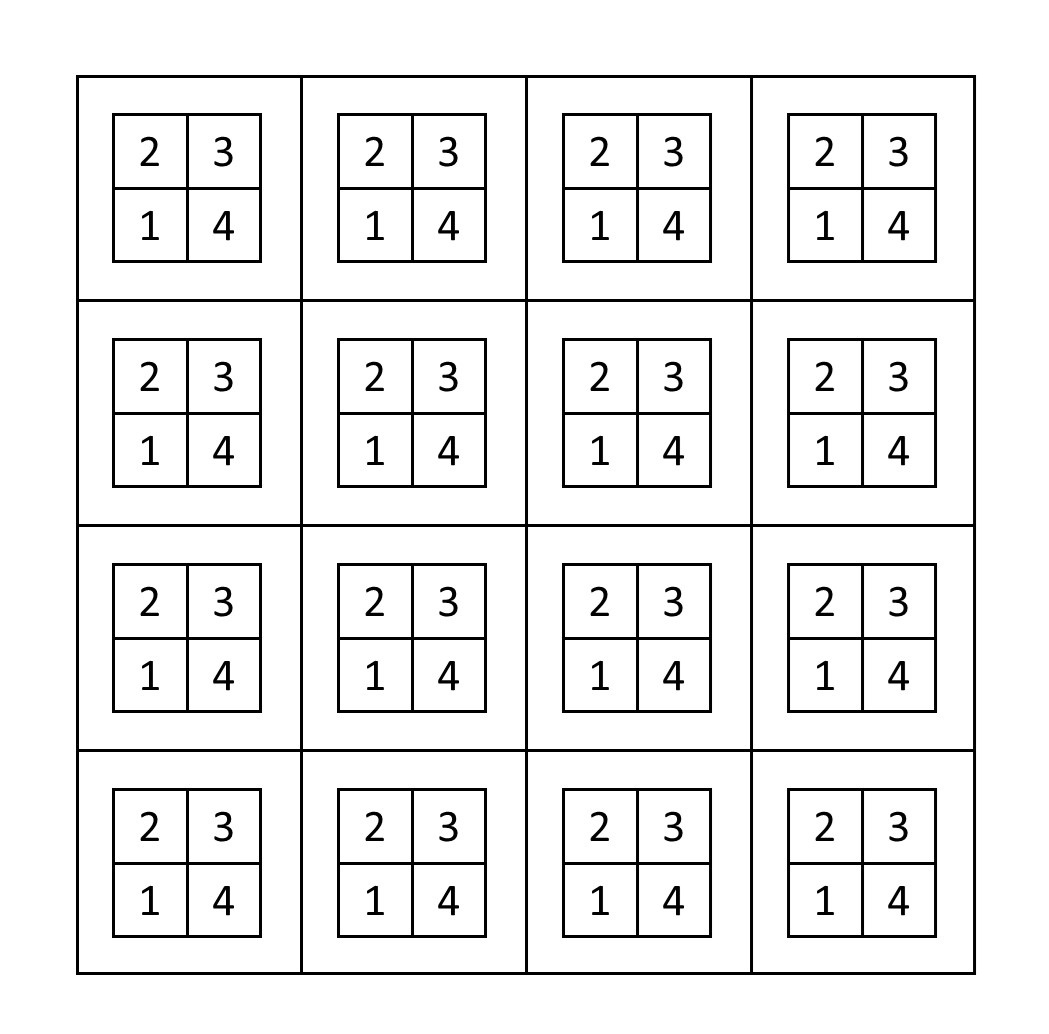
Hijara layout

The original commercial edition of Hijara has a game board of 16 squares, divided into 4 sections numbered 1 through 4 and a score-keeping "ladder" on either end.

Players choose either yellow or blue and use 32 same-color stones plus one score-keeper each. Blue starts and players take turns placing their stones, one at a time, on any square, building on those already on the board, to complete and block point-scoring combinations. When a player places a stone on a square, it must be placed in the lowest-numbered open section in that square. So, for every square, the first small stone must be placed on the 1, second on the 2, etc.

The game starts with an empty board, and ends with a full board with 3 ways to score points when placement of four same-color stones is completed in any of the following combinations:

- 10 points - 4 stones of the same color on 4 numbers of a kind in a row - horizontally, vertically, or diagonally.
- 15 points - 4 stones of the same color in numerical sequence (i.e. 1-2-3-4) - horizontally, vertically, or diagonally.
- 20 points - 4 stones of the same color in one square.

Points are won with a player's own-color stones and are always accrued, never deducted. Several point-scoring combinations may be completed at one time with a single stone. Overlooked points are forfeited and, throughout the game, players keep score on their side of the board with an extra stone of their color.

The game is over when the last small stone is placed and all the numbers are covered then, by comparing accrued points totals, the player with the greater number of points is the winner of the game.

== Awards ==
- Games Magazine 1995 Buyers Guide To Games - USA
- Games Magazine 1996 Top 100 - USA
- Spiel Gut 2006 Recommendation - Germany

== See also ==
- List of abstract strategy games
