= Asalto =

Board game

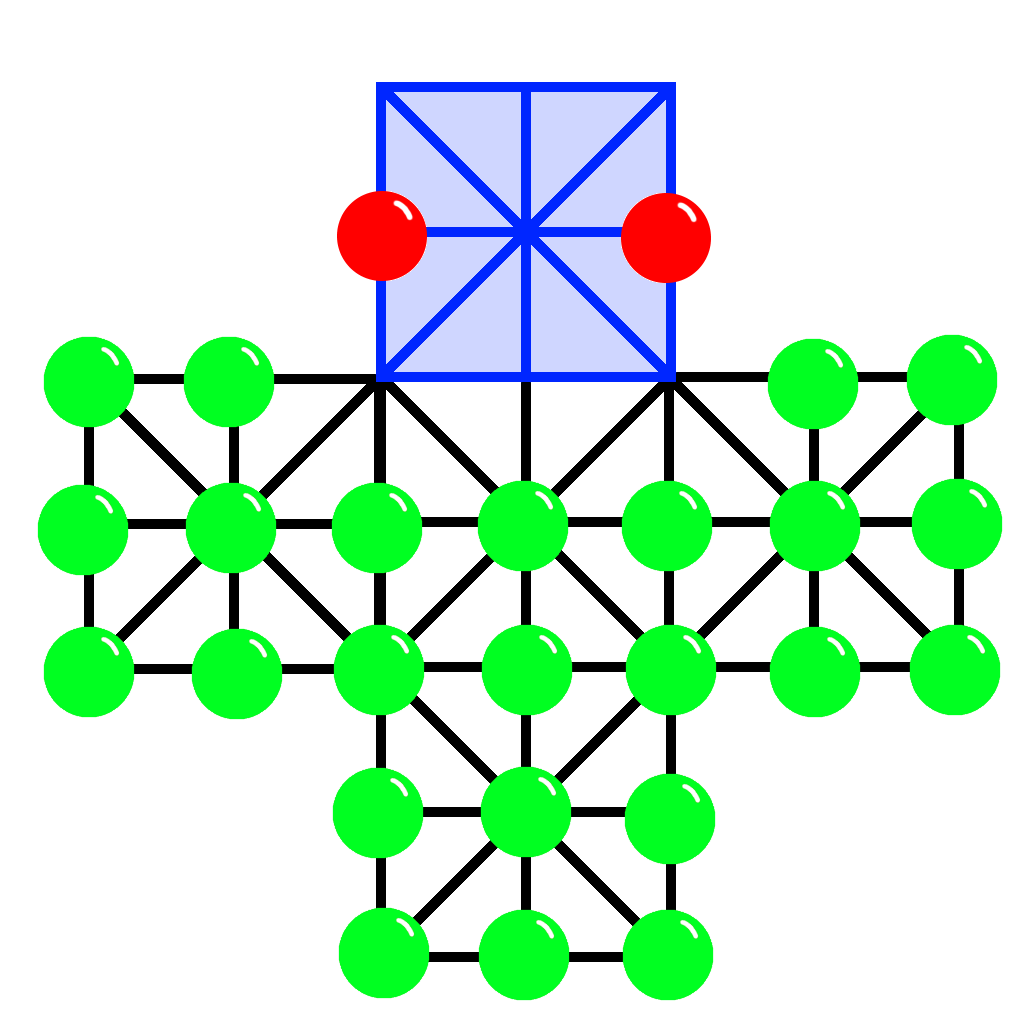
Asalto board diagram including fortress (blue) with rebel pieces (green) and officers (red) in their starting positions

Asalto, also known as the Assault Game, German Tactics or Officers and Sepoys, is a board game for two players in which one player, playing as the officers, attempts to defend a fortress from their opponent's invading rebels. The game is a variant on the Fox and Geese theme, and is commonly played in Germany, France, and England.

== Rules ==
Asalto is an asymmetric game in which the players take on two different roles: the rebels and the officers. The rebels' objective is to capture the two officers, surround them so that they cannot move, or occupy all nine points within the "fortress". The officers' objective is to capture enough rebels that these tasks become impossible.

=== Setup ===
Asalto is played on a grid of 33 intersection points in the shape of a cross, with a specially denoted arm known as the fortress at the top of the board. The total number of pieces in an Asalto game is 26, composed of 24 rebels and two officers. Before play begins, the rebels are arranged so that they sit on the 24 intersection points outside the fortress, while the officers may be arranged at the player's discretion inside the fortress. The rebel player takes the first turn.

=== Movement and capturing ===
On their turn, a player may only move one piece, although the rules governing movement are different for each player.

Officers may move one space along any line on the board in any direction. To capture a rebel piece, an officer may jump over it into an empty space beyond. This action can only occur along a straight, marked line. The officer may jump multiple times in one turn, but may not jump the same piece twice. Officers may not change direction in midair, but may change direction in between jumps. Officers may not jump over each other.

Rebel pieces may move one space along any line on the board, but only in the direction of the fortress. Rebel pieces cannot capture directly, but may do so through huffing.

If the officers' player fails to capture a rebel piece when possible, the rebel player can point out the missed capture and remove the officer that failed to make it. This is called 'huffing'. If both officers are huffed, the rebel player wins.

=== Ending ===
If the rebel player has successfully trapped both officers, huffed both officers, or occupied the nine points within the fortress, they have won the game.

If the officer player has captured enough rebels (Note: This number is arbitrary: with eight remaining, occupation of the fortress is impossible; with three, trapping of both officers is impossible; with two, trapping of one is impossible; and only with zero is a rebel win impossible, as huffing would otherwise remain a possibility.) to make their opponent's task impossible, the officer player has won the game.

=== Variations ===
When playing German Tactics, the rebel pieces may not move along any horizontal lines except those at the top of the arms of the cross. Officers and Sepoys uses a larger board and has 50 rebel pieces and three officers.

== See also ==
- List of abstract strategy games
