= Rhumb Line (board game) =

Board game

- Designers: Martin H. Samuel
- Illustrators: Martin H. Samuel
- Publishers: Games Above Board Channel Craft Naughty Bits Software
- Players: 2
- Setup time: 1 minute
- Playing time: 20 minutes
- Age range: 8 and up
- Skills: Tactics, strategy, concentration

Rhumb Line is a two-player abstract strategy board game by Martin H. Samuel, played with glass pieces on mousepad-type material, using placement and point accumulation to win. The game board and instructions have a nautical theme, based in part on the concept of the rhumb line and historic games played by sailors.

Rhumb Line II is a 50-page note pad travel version played with a blue and a yellow pen. An iPhone app version was produced in 2010 and is no longer available.

== Components ==
- Compass rose game board
- 20 Officer (yellow) and 20 sailor (blue) glass pieces (extra pieces are provided for each player)
- Velour pouch
- Instructions

== Objective ==
The goal of the game is to out-navigate the opposition and achieve victory by placing nuggets on the board to build and/or block point-scoring "rhumb line" combinations of radii, arcs and spirals.

== Gameplay ==
The Rhumb Line game board consists of a compass rose with 32 marked points with a score-keeping "ladder" on either end.

Players choose either Officer yellow or Sailor blue and use 16 same-color pieces + 1 score-keeper each. Officer (yellow) starts and players take turns placing their pieces, one at a time, on any empty point, building on those already on the board, to complete and/or block point-scoring combinations.

Start with an empty board, end with a full board ... with 3 ways to score points when placement of four same-color pieces is completed in any of the following combinations:

- 10 points - 4 same-color pieces in a radius
- 20 points - 4 same-color pieces in an arc
- 30 points - 4 same-color pieces in a spiral

To avoid a foregone conclusion, when both players have only one piece, they remove any one of their pieces (once only) and, on their next turn, place it somewhere else on the board.

Points are won with a player's own-color pieces and always accrued, never deducted. Several point-scoring "rhumb line" combinations may be completed at one time with a single piece. Overlooked points are forfeited and, throughout the game, players keep score on their side of the board with an extra piece of their color.

The game is over when the last piece is placed and all the points are covered then, by comparing accrued points totals, the player with the most points is the winner of the game.

== Awards ==
- Major Fun 2008 Thinking

== See also ==
- List of abstract strategy games
