= Jul-gonu =

Abstract strategy board game for two players

Jul-gonu (Korean: 줄 고누) is a two-player abstract strategy board game from Korea. It is one of many gonu games. The game has a relatively small board (4×4 square board), and yet offers a challenge at different levels. The game could be played on a larger board, however, it tends to be tiresome. Jul means "lines", and the lines of the board are often drawn on the ground. The game is also referred to as ne-jul-gonu (네 줄 고누; lit. four-line gonu), referring to the four lines in each direction.

The game bears resemblance to hasami shogi, dai hasami shogi, mak-yek, apit-sodok, rek, ming mang, gundru, seega, ludus latrunculorum, petteia, and Firdawsi's nard. It also bears resemblance to the tafl games, and to a lesser extent to agon, awithlaknakwe, bizingo, watermelon chess, reversi, Othello, wei-chi, baduk, and Go as all of these games exhibit custodian capture or some form of it (as in the case of wei-chi, baduk, and Go).

== Setup ==
A 4×4 square board (or grid) is used. Each player has four pieces. One plays as the black pieces, and the other plays as the white pieces. If one has a piecepack, the board is made from four face-down tiles, and players use coins, suit side up, as playing pieces.

Players decide what colors to play, and who starts first.

Each player's four pieces are initially set up on the first rank of their respective side of the board and which is opposite of one another.

== Rules ==
- Players alternate their turns. Each player moves only one piece per turn.
- A piece moves orthogonally (following the lines) one space onto a vacant space per turn. However, a move that repeats the previous position is not allowed.
- Capture of an enemy piece or a line of (two) enemy pieces is done by the custodian method, and this must be created by the player performing the capture on his or her turn. The player's piece moves adjacently next to an enemy piece or line of (two) enemy pieces that are already flanked on the other side by a friendly piece. All these pieces must be in the same row or column with no vacant space between any of them.
- A piece that moves in between two enemy pieces on a row or column (with no vacant space between any of them) is not captured by the enemy player. As mentioned earlier, custodian capture must be created on the turn of the player performing the capture, and in this case the enemy player did not create the custodian capture on his or her turn. One of the enemy pieces must move away, and then return to the same position to capture the sandwiched piece if the opportunity is still available.
  - Similarly, if a piece moves next to a friendly piece and both these pieces are sandwiched between two enemy pieces on the same row or column (with no vacant space between any two of them), then neither of the two sandwiched pieces are captured. One of the enemy pieces must move away, and then return to the same position to capture the sandwiched pieces if the opportunity is still available.
- The captured pieces are removed from the board at the end of each turn.
- Two custodian captures can be performed in one turn. Only one such general case exist, and it involves a row and a column:
  - A piece that moves between two enemy pieces in such a way that one of the enemy pieces is on the same row, and the other enemy piece is on the same column, and that each enemy piece is flanked on the other side by a friendly piece of the same row or column respectively (with no vacant space between any of them), this is cause for the capture of the two enemy pieces. This case can be extended to cover a line of two adjacent enemy pieces either on a row or column.
- A player wins if he or she reduces the other player's pieces to one, or stalemates opposing pieces by not allowing them to move on their turn. An opponent with only one piece left is not a threat as it can no longer perform a custodian capture or initiate a stalemate.
