= Cinc camins =

Chinese children's game

Cinc camins is a two-player abstract strategy game from northern China. Although played by children, there is a complexity and uniqueness to the game that adults can appreciate. The game may be related to the gonu (kono) games of Korea. These games use small boards, and have unique capturing rules.

Each player has five pieces played on a 5 x 5 square grid. A player can capture an enemy piece by forming a line of two pieces of their own in a row or column. The enemy piece must be in the same row or column as the two pieces, and the remaining two spaces left on the row or column must be blank.

Cinc camins is Catalan for five paths.

== Goal ==
The player who captures all the other player's pieces is the winner.

== Equipment ==
The board used is a 5 x 5 square grid. Each player has five pieces. One plays the black pieces, and the other player plays the white pieces. The game is often drawn on the ground, and sweets or candy are used as game pieces.

== Game play and rules ==
1. Players decide what colors to play and who starts first.

2. Each player's five pieces are initially set up on their first rank.

3. Players alternate their turns. A player may move one piece per turn orthogonally.

4. When a player forms a row or column of two pieces of their own, and the two pieces are adjacent with one another (i.e. no space(s) in between them), then it captures an enemy piece adjacent to the two pieces in the row or column that the line is formed upon, provided that the two remaining spaces on the row or column are empty or blank. In any row or column there are five spaces since the board is a 5 x 5 square grid.

The possible combinations for black to capture a white piece in a row or column is as follows. They are the same capturing combinations for white, but with a reversal in coding of black and white pieces.

Let b = black, w = white, and _ = blank

(b b w _ _) or (_ b b w _) or (_ _ b b w) or (_ _ w b b) or (_ w b b _) or (w b b _ _)

The rules do not clarify if the capturing player must initiate this capture during their turn by making the move that fulfills the capturing criteria. That is, an enemy's piece is not captured if the enemy himself moved his piece on his turn such that it fulfills the other player's capturing criteria.

5. A piece may either move into the row or column to form the two adjacent pieces, or leave a triplet of pieces from a row or column leaving two adjacent pieces.

6. A piece may move to create more than one capturing row or capturing column, and capture all possible enemy pieces.

In the external link below, a game is provided showing a black piece leaving a row and entering the row above it. By doing so, the black piece leaves behind two adjacent black pieces from the previous row, and captures the white piece (marked as D) on that row. At the same time, by moving into the new row above the previous row, it forms a column of two adjacent black pieces, and captures the white piece in the same column (marked as A). In both instances the two adjacent black pieces are adjacent to the white piece that they capture which is a requirement. However, Black cannot capture the white piece (marked as E) even though two adjacent black pieces are adjacent to E, because in that row there does not exist two blank spaces which is a capturing requirement due to the presence of the white piece (marked as C) on the same row.

== Variants ==
A computer game Pangki for Windows which was released in 2000 and developed by Code Zone bears similarity with cinc camins. Pangki was written by John Hattan (credited as John 'Flyman' Hattan). Pangki consist of a 4x4 square board and six pieces for each player. It therefore has a smaller board than cinc camins, but ironically perhaps it also has more pieces. Each player's pieces are initially laid out on the four squares of their respective first rank, and the two outer squares of their respective second rank. Only the four middle squares of the board are left empty. Once the game commences, players take turns moving their pieces to an orthogonally empty adjacent square. A player may capture an enemy piece if exactly two of his pieces are adjacent with one another on a row or column, and these two adjacent pieces are adjacent to the enemy's piece in that same row or column, with the remaining square in the same row or column being empty or blank. The rules do not clarify if the capturing player must initiate this capture during their turn by making the move that fulfills the capturing criteria. That is, an enemy's piece is not captured if the enemy himself moved his piece on his turn such that it fulfills the other player's capturing criteria. A player is limited to capturing one enemy piece on any one row or column in a single turn, but may have the opportunity of capturing up to three enemy pieces in a single turn if enemy pieces are captured on a row and a column, and/or two adjacent rows, and/or two adjacent columns. A player wins if their opponent's pieces are reduced to one or less, or if their opponent cannot perform a legal move due to its pieces being blocked.

Following are the four possible ways Black may capture a single piece of White's on a row or column. They are the same capturing combinations for White if the black and white pieces are switched for one another:

Let b = black, w = white, and _ = blank

(_ b b w) or (_ w b b) or (b b w _) or (w b b _)

(b b b w) or (w b b b) are legal formations but do not result in a capture by Black since there is no empty space. Similarly, (w b b w) is a legal formation, but does not result in a capture of any of the two white pieces for the same reason.

Pangki is a strongly solved game, and it was solved as a draw. It was solved by Jason Doucette in 2001 using a software that he created called Pangki God. Pangki God is a retrograde analysis endgame database solver.

The origin of Pangki is somewhat obscure. Doucette discovered the game while on a friend's computer who had a copy of a software called Top 50 Blazing Windows 95/98 Games, and that software installed under the name of Solid Gold Games by Cosmi Software which included the game Pangki. Doucette goes on to say that the author John Hatton had discovered the game from a large collection of obscure books of game rules from other countries. Furthermore, Hatton recalls that it was a popular game among kids from Southeast Asia.

== Related games ==
- Jul-gonu
- Four-field kono
- Five-field kono
