= Focus (board game) =

Abstract strategy board game

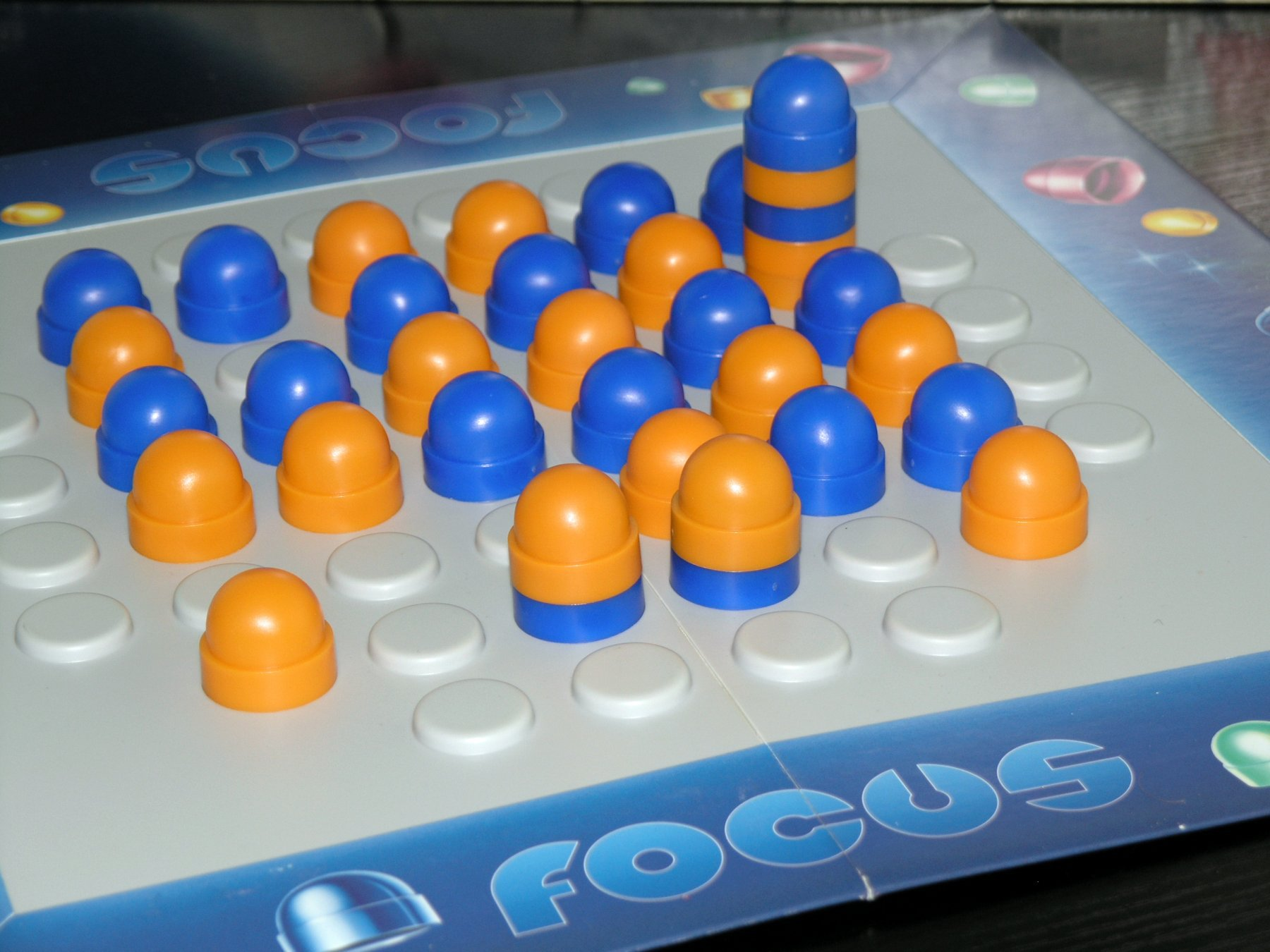
- Designers: Sid Sackson
- Publishers: Kosmos; Milton Bradley; Parker Brothers
- Publication: 1963; 62 years ago
- Players: 2–4
- Playing time: 45'
- Skills: Strategy

Focus is an abstract strategy board game, designed by Sid Sackson and first published in 1963 by Kosmos. The game has been re-published many times since, sometimes under the titles Domination or Dominio. Focus won the 1981 Spiel des Jahres and Essen Feather awards. The game appears in Sackson's A Gamut of Games in the section New Battles on an Old Battlefield.

== Gameplay ==
Starting positions

Two to four players move stacks of one to five pieces around a checkerboard with the three squares in each corner removed, thus forming a 6×6 board with 1×4 extensions on each side. Stacks may move as many spaces as there are pieces in the stack. Players may only move a stack if the topmost piece in the stack is one of their pieces. When a stack lands on another stack, the two stacks merge; if the new stack contains more than five pieces, then pieces are removed from the bottom to bring it down to five. If a player's own piece is removed, they are kept and may be placed on the board later in lieu of moving a stack. If an opponent's piece is removed, it is captured. The last player who is able to move a stack wins.

== Reception ==
Games included the game as Domination in their "Top 100 Games of 1982", noting that while it does include short versions for 3-4 players, "the two-player game has the most depth".

== Reviews ==
- Family Games: The 100 Best

== See also ==
- Death Stacks
