= Brax (game) =

- Board for Brax, without pieces. The diamonds in rows 1 and 9 mark the starting positions for each player.
- Designers: Frederic B. Denham
- Publication: 1889
- Genres: abstract strategy
- Players: 2-4
- Chance: none

Brax is a two-player abstract strategy board game. It was invented in 1889 (or shortly before) in America by Frederic B. Denham of New York City. The board design is unique. The players move their pieces along paths on the square board; each path is one of two colors. A piece can move one or two spaces in a turn depending upon whether it matches the color of the path. Players attempt to capture each other's pieces.

Brax was featured in The Book of Classic Board Games, written by Sid Sackson and published by Klutz Press in 1991, which ranked it among the top 15 board games in history.

The game is also known as Jinx. A unique feature in Brax and Jinx is that players can call out "Brax" or "Jinx" if their piece threatens the other player's piece(s). This forces the other player to move the threatened piece on their next move (no other piece may be moved), and the threatened piece is jinxed; hence the name of the game Jinx.

There are three-player, four-player, and "fox and geese" (hunt game) versions of Brax.

== Goal ==
A player wins when they have captured all their opponent's pieces.

== Equipment ==
The board is composed of 64 square cells, laid out in eight rows and columns. The board is further designed with lines marked along the borders between cells in one of two colors (e.g. blue and red). Each square cell has three sides in one color and one side in the second color.

Equivalently, the board can be considered as a square grid of 9×9 lines, with two, three, or four lines connecting each of the 81 intersection points; there are four two-line points at the corners of the board, twenty-eight three-line points along the edges of the board, and forty-nine four-line points in the interior of the board. Each connecting line is one of the two colors. In the blank sample board depicted here, each intersection point is addressed with a column (A through I) and row number (1 through 9).

Each player has seven pieces of the same two colors as the marked lines (e.g. blue and red). In the patent, it is suggested the pieces have one side plain and the other side marked to facilitate three or four-player games, where multiple players work together as a team. The starting position for each player's seven pieces is in the rank closest to that player, as designated by the diamonds in Row 1 and Row 9, on the example board illustrated.

=== Variations ===
Denham describes and illustrates variant game boards with non-square unit cells, including rhombuses, hexagons, and octagons. For each of these $2n$-sided unit cells, $n+x$ sides are one color, while $n-x$ sides are the opposing colors, where $x=\frac{n}{2}$, rounded down to the nearest integer.

== Gameplay and rules ==
1. Players decide what colors to play and who starts first.
2. Each player's pieces are placed on the inner seven positions of that player's first rank.
3. Players alternate their turns. Only one piece may be moved in a turn.
4. A player's piece moves orthogonally in any direction on the marked lines or segments between the intersection points. A player piece may move one or two spaces depending upon the color of the marked line(s).
  - If the movement is along a line of their own color, then the piece can move one or two spaces provided the piece travels along the line of their color for both spaces. However, the piece cannot, for example, move one space forward, and then one space back in one turn, and thus repeat the previous position.
  - Alternatively, if the line is the color of the other player, then the piece may only move one space.
  - Pieces cannot be moved over an occupied point, with the exception of a double-capture move.
5. A piece captures an enemy piece by displacement as in Chess. A piece moves into the same space as the enemy piece, and the enemy piece is removed.
  - It is possible that one player's piece can capture two enemy pieces in one turn. This happens when the player's piece is able to move two spaces on its own colored line, displacing two opponent pieces on those two spaces.
  - It is not required to capture the opposing player's piece, even if it is a legal move.
6. A player (designated Player A) may call "Brax" or "Jinx" after moving their piece, if the same piece that was just moved threatens at least one of their opponent's (Player B's) pieces, meaning that on Player A's next turn, Player B's piece(s) can be captured. By calling "Brax", Player B is forced to move the threatened piece on their next turn (no other piece can be moved). If two (or more) pieces of Player B are threatened, then Player B can decide which piece to move.
  - "Brax" can only be called immediately after a player has moved their piece into a threatening position, and that piece threatens at least one enemy piece.
  - Player B may capture the Player A piece that poses the threat if that is a legal move for Player B.
  - If Player B moves their piece into a threatened situation, Player A may choose not to capture it, but call out "Brax" after they take their turn and move a different piece (i.e., not the threatening piece). Player B is then forced to move the threatened piece, as previously described.
  - The player who called "Brax" cannot call "Brax" on their next turn; instead they must wait for at least one turn before they can call "Brax" again.
  - A player does not have to call "Brax" when threatening their opponent's piece(s), if they do not wish to, however, the opposing player is not forced to move the threatened piece(s) on their next move. This may occur when the pieces mutually threaten each other, and neither player needs to call "Brax" until it is advantageous.
7. When one player has only one piece left on the board, and the other player has only two pieces left on the board, then "Brax" can no longer be called by either player.

=== 1, 3, and 4-player games ===
1. For games using three or four players, it is suggested that two players form a team using a single color.
  - In the three-player variant, each player on the team with two players plays with three pieces: one player of that team plays with the plain side of the piece face-up, and the other player on the same team uses pieces with the marked side face-up. Each player on the two-player team will take a single turn as described in the two-player game. The opposing player will play with five pieces, and moves two different pieces per turn.
  - In the four-player variant, there will be two teams with two players each. Each player takes three pieces, and the individual player within the team is distinguished again by playing with either the plain or marked side of the pieces. Each individual player starts from a different side of the board.
2. A solitaire hunt game variant is suggested, in which the player takes a single piece and tries to capture all the pieces in the opposing color. The opposing color pieces are moved "in a predetermined manner" which is not described in detail.

=== Examples ===
1: Potential moves for the Blue piece at E3

2: Potential captures for the Red piece at E6

3: Red calls out "Brax" after moving to E6

Example 1

For movement, consider a Blue piece at location E3. Pieces may move two spaces along friendly lines, and one space along opposing lines. The second move on a friendly line does not have to be in the same direction as the first move. That means there are multiple possible moves:

- (E3)-E4-E5 [or (E3)-E4] along Blue (friendly) lines
- (E3)-E4-D4 [or (E3)-E4] along Blue (friendly) lines
- (E3)-D3-C3 [or (E3)-D3] along Blue (friendly) lines
- (E3)-D3-D2 [or (E3)-D3] along Blue (friendly) lines
- (E3)-F3 along Red (opponent) lines
- (E3)-E2 along Red (opponent) lines

Example 2

For capture, consider a Red piece at location E6 with Blue pieces nearby. Again, pieces may move two spaces along friendly lines, and one space along opposing lines. That means the following captures are possible:

- (E6)-F6-F5 along Red (friendly) lines, capturing two Blue pieces
- (E6)-D6 along Blue (opponent) lines, capturing one Blue piece

Example 3

On the other hand, if the Red piece had just moved from (D6) to location E6 and the Red player called "Brax" or "Jinx", the Blue player is forced to move the Blue piece that is threatened at F5. Because the Blue piece at F5 cannot capture the Red piece at E6 because it is two spaces away along a Red line, alternative valid moves would include (F5)-E5-E4, (F5)-F4-G4, and (F5)-G5-G6. Although the Blue piece also could move (F5)-F6, this would be ineffective in escaping the potential capture, as the Red piece could simply capture the Blue piece on the following turn.
