= Ponte del Diavolo =

Strategic boardgame

- Players: 2
- Setup time: 1 minute
- Playing time: 30-60 minutes (10×10 and 12×12 board sizes)
- Chance: None
- Age range: 10+

Ponte del Diavolo (Italian for "Devil's bridge") by Martin Ebel is a territorial game (with connective elements similar to Go), in which two players create islands and then add bridges to connect them. It was created by Martin Ebel and published by Hans im Glück in 2007 and by Rio Grande Games in 2008. Games magazine named Ponte del Diavolo their "Best New Abstract Strategy Game" Winner for 2009.
