= Gess =

Abstract strategy board game

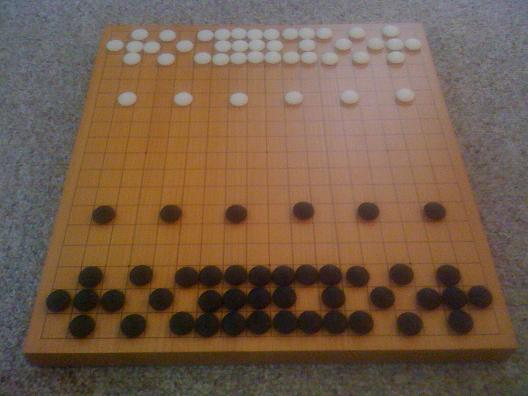
Gess starting position

Gess is an abstract strategy board game for two players, involving a grid board and mutating pieces. The name was chosen as a conflation of "chess" and "Go". It is pronounced with a hard "g" as in "Go", and is thus homophonous with "guess".

Gess was created by the Puzzles and Games Ring of The Archimedeans, and first published in 1994 in the society's journal Eureka. It was popularized by Ian Stewart's Mathematical Recreations column in the November 1994 issue of Scientific American.

== Rules ==
- Gess is played on a grid of 18 × 18 squares.
- Two players, "Black" and "White", each have 43 stones of their colour on the board in the starting configuration.
- Starting with Black, players take turns moving a piece on the board. A move must always change the stone configuration on the board. There is no passing.
- A piece consists of a 3 × 3 grid of squares, at least one of which must exist on the board. Only stones of one colour may be in the grid. There must be at least one stone on the eight squares around the central square.
- A piece can only be moved by the player whose stones are inside the grid.
- The 3 × 3 grid is termed the footprint of the piece. Each piece can move as determined by the stones in its footprint:
  - The central square determines the extent of the piece's movement. If the square is unoccupied, it may move up to three spaces; if it is occupied by a stone, it may move any number of spaces.
  - Each of the eight surrounding squares determines the directions the piece can move. If a square has a stone, the piece can move in the direction indicated by the square's location relative to the central square; if a square is unoccupied, the piece cannot move in that direction.
- As a piece moves, all of the stones in its footprint move in unison.
- When the footprint of a piece coincides with any other stones on the board, those stones are removed from the board and the move ends.
- Pieces can be moved partially, but not entirely, off the board. The stones of the piece which are on a square that has moved out of the board are removed.
- A move also may end before any stone is removed.
- A ring is any piece consisting of eight stones around an empty central square.
- The game object is to be the only player with a ring piece on the board: when, at the end of any turn, a player has no ring pieces on the board, that player loses the game. If neither player has a ring piece, the player who has just moved loses.

== Equipment ==
A Go set is one easy way to assemble the equipment needed for gess. The 19 × 19 line grid is simultaneously an 18 × 18 grid of squares, and the starting position needs only 43 each of the black and white stones.

== Influences ==
The rules describe a highly variable set of pieces, which will often change every turn. In total there are 510 possible sets of a footprint; however, the starting position uses these rules to emulate chess pieces on a 6×6 board: king, queen, bishop, rook and pawn in this order R–B–Q–K–B–R in the last row (black's view) and 6 pawns in the next row. The game objective, to remove the opponent's "ring" (described as a piece that moves like a chess king) also mimics that of chess.

== Notation ==
The rows are named 2 to 19 (1 and 20 being outside the grid), and the files are named b to s (a and t again being outside the grid).

A move is notated by noting the place of the centre of the footprint at the beginning of a move and its place at the end of the move.
