= Abacus checkers =

Two-player Chinese game played on a Suanpan abacus

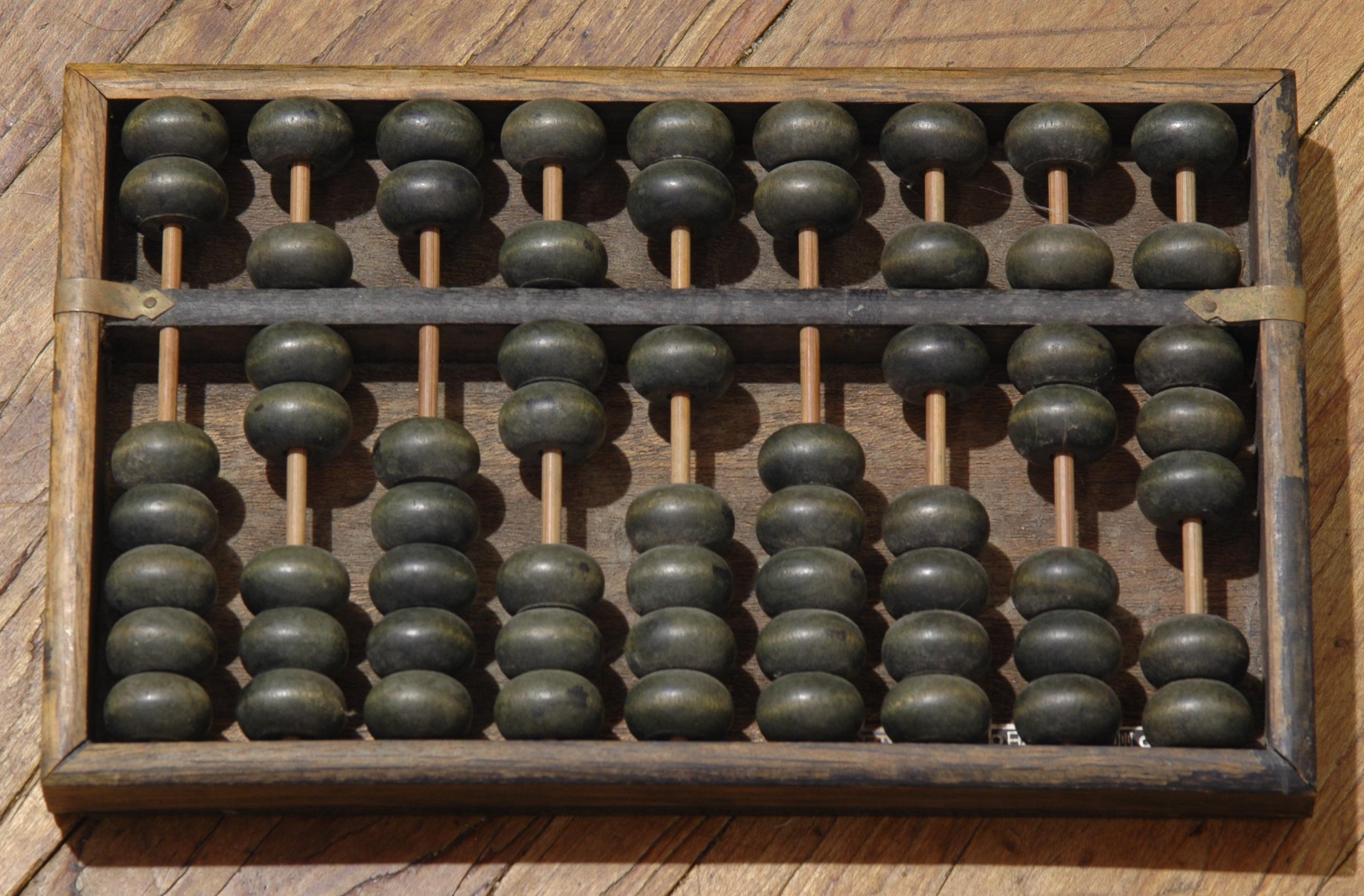
A suanpan abacus

Abacus checkers (Chinese: 算盘棋; pinyin: suànpánqí) is a traditional two-player game popular in China. The game is played on a five-plus-two bead suanpan abacus. Rules are grouped into three main categories: Halma-type, Checkers-type, and Go-type.

== Rules ==
=== Halma-type ===
One player uses the up-beam while another player uses the down-beam. The initial layout for each side of the upper five beads on the beam, the beam under five on the other side of each beads by beam. Pieces can be stacked in one's own beads. The beam up stacked two beads, five beads up stacked beam. Each round of selection is one of the two movements, a bead on the side towards one's own a move. If the front side of the square is the beam can be moved to the file. Skip the entire front of the beam with the enemy count all the front file, to the first without the enemy count beads on the beam of the file.

=== Go-type ===
One game player uses the upper-beam while the other game player uses the downer-beam. The initial layout for each side of the upper fifth two beads on the beam, the beam on the other side of the five two beads on beam. Pieces can be stacked in one's own beads. Upper and downer-beam up to fold two beads. Each round of selection is one of the two movements, a bead on the side towards one's own move. If the front of the adjacent files only one or more of the bead by the beam, player can move to the file. If there are two enemy beads, then the bead away from the beam has to be moved back to the side of the side of a file. Ten beads on the enemy's side are required to win.
