= Neutron (game) =

Strategy game

An example of Neutron.

Neutron is a two-player abstract strategy game invented by Robert A. Kraus. The game was first published in the Playroom section of Games & Puzzles in 1978. It is a game where each player moves two different pieces in a single turn without the use of dice.

There are 15 variants to this game. Neutron and some of its variants are some of the main games featured in Zillions of Games.

The game has been solved to some degree. Analysis has shown that the first player wins. It is unknown whether the other variants have been solved or not, and to what degree.

== Equipment ==
It is normally played on a 5 x 5 board. (Some variants of the game use different-sized boards). Each player has five pieces, and there is also a neutral piece called the neutron that is played by both players.

== Rules and game play ==
1. The game starts with five white pieces on White's home row (one edge of the board), five black pieces on Black's home row, and the neutron in the center.
2. All pieces move in a straight line horizontally, vertically, or diagonally, but they must move as far as they can go in the chosen direction. They can only move through or onto empty squares and there is no capturing.
3. Play begins with one player moving a piece from the home row. Thereafter on each turn, a player moves first the neutron and then one of his or her pieces.
4. The object of the game is to move the neutron into your home row, cause your opponent to move the neutron into your home row, or to block the neutron completely so your opponent cannot move it.

== External links and further reading ==
- http://homepages.di.fc.ul.pt/~jpn/gv/neutron.htm
- http://www.gamecabinet.com/rules/Neutron.html
- https://web.archive.org/web/20091027063748/http://www.geocities.com/bob_kraus_2000/Zillions.html
- Helena Verrill (1986). Neutron. Eureka: The Archimedeans' Journal. 46–50: 62
