= High jump (game) =

Board game

a5 black circle	b5 black circle	c5 black circle	d5 black circle	e5 black circle
a4 black circle	b4 black circle	c4 black circle	d4 black circle	e4 black circle
a3 black circle	b3 black circle	c3 black cross	d3 white circle	e3 white circle
a2 white circle	b2 white circle	c2 white circle	d2 white circle	e2 white circle
a1 white circle	b1 white circle	c1 white circle	d1 white circle	e1 white circle

High jump starting position

High jump is a two-player strategy board game from Somalia. It is related to draughts and alquerque as pieces hop over one another for capture; however, pieces move and capture orthogonally and not diagonally. Moreover, the game is played on a 5×5 square board. A feature of high jump is that the central square offers a kind of sanctuary; a piece occupying the central square cannot be hopped over and captured. The same board is used in the game Seega.

== Layout ==
A 5×5 square board is used. The central square can be marked with an "X" or any special marking. Each player has twelve pieces. One plays the black pieces, and the other plays the white pieces. Players decide what colors to play, and who starts first.

Each player's pieces are set up on the first two ranks of their side of the board, and on the right two squares (from their point of view) of the third rank which is the middle rank of the board. Only the central square of the board is empty in the beginning.

== Rules ==
- Players alternate their turns throughout the game.
- Pieces move orthogonally (not diagonally) one space per turn onto a vacant adjacent square.
- Alternatively, a piece can capture an orthogonally adjacent enemy piece by leaping over it, and landing on a vacant square adjacently on the other side. The piece can continue capturing if it is able to. Captures are not compulsory.
- A piece in the central square cannot be leaped over and/or captured.

A player wins, if all of their opponent's pieces are captured.

== See also ==
- Draughts
- Alquerque

== Bibliography ==
- Bell, R. C. (1979) [1st pub. 1960, Oxford University Press, London]. Board and Table Games From Many Civilizations. Vol. I (Revised ed.). Dover Publications Inc. ISBN 0-671-06030-9.
- Murray, H. J. R. (1978) [1st pub. 1952, Oxford University Press]. A History of Board-Games other than Chess (Reissued ed.). Hacker Art Books Inc. ISBN 0-87817-211-4.
