= Irensei =

Board game

- Players: 2
- Setup time: None
- Playing time: casual: 5-30 minutes tournament: 1-2 hours^{*}
- Chance: None
- Age range: 5+
- Skills: Strategy, Observation

Irensei (Japanese: 囲連星) is an abstract strategy board game. Traditionally, it is played using Go pieces (black and white stones) on a Go board (19x19 intersections), but any equipment suitable for playing Go can also be used for Irensei.

== How to play ==
Black plays first, and players alternate placing a stone of their color on an empty intersection. The winner is the first player to create an unbroken row of seven stones horizontally, vertically, or diagonally.

There are two restrictions: (1) a line of seven stones that includes any point on the outer two lines of the board does not constitute a win, and (2) Black cannot form a line of eight or more stones. However, if a group of stones is enclosed by the opponent according to Go rules, the stones are removed. Diagonal connections count toward winning but not capturing. The suicide and Ko rules also apply and are often crucial in winning the game.
