= Accasta =

Abstract strategy board game

Accasta is a stacking abstract strategy board game on a hexagonal board for two players. The game was designed by Dieter Stein and published solely over the web and in the German game design magazine Spiel & Autor.

== History ==
Accasta was influenced by Dr. Emanuel Lasker's Lasca and Wladyslaw Gliński's hexagonal chess. Dieter Stein tried to achieve a clean and original game differing from the hexagonal chess but to have minor similarities.

After a long time of development, in the spring of 1998, the game became published on the Web and in a German game inventor's magazine. That same year it was published, Accosta took part in some game design competitions and was one of the finalists of the Premio Archimede in Italy in 1998. Just three years later, in 2001, the first version of the game available for online play was developed and implemented.

== Gameplay ==
Accasta is played on a hexagonal board where each player controls a set of stackable pieces. The objective is to maneuver pieces strategically to capture and control key areas of the board while preventing the opponent from doing the same. Movement is determined by stack height, with taller stacks having greater mobility. A single piece can move one space, while a stack of two can move two spaces, and so on. Stacks can be split, allowing for dynamic positioning and tactical flexibility.

=== Strategic Elements ===
A key element of Accasta is managing the height of stacks effectively. Taller stacks provide greater movement range but also become targets for capture. Players must decide when to build larger stacks for mobility and when to keep pieces dispersed for control over the board. Blocking an opponent's movement by strategically placing pieces is a fundamental tactic.

Another crucial aspect is timing. Since movement potential increases with stack height, players must anticipate the opponent's strategy and adjust their own formations accordingly. Defensive positioning, where stacks are arranged to limit an opponent's ability to expand, can be just as important as offensive maneuvers. Careful planning and adaptability are required to secure a winning advantage.

The game encourages both aggressive and defensive strategies, rewarding players who can balance expansion with protection. Recognizing patterns in an opponent's play and setting traps can lead to significant positional advantages. The ability to split stacks effectively allows for surprising counterattacks and last-minute adjustments.

Accasta's depth lies in its simple yet nuanced mechanics, making it a game of skill and foresight rather than chance.

== Trilogy ==
Stein creating a stacking game trilogy of three games which included:

- Accasta (1998)
- Abande (2005)
- Attangle (2006)
