= Death Stacks =

Board game

Death Stacks is an abstract strategy board game for two players invented by Stephen Euin Cobb. Death Stacks can be classified as a variant of the game Focus by Sid Sackson, published in A Gamut of Games.

The Annual Death Stacks Tournament is held in Charlotte, North Carolina each summer and is hosted by the science fiction convention, ConCarolinas.

== History ==
The game was invented November 27, 2002. The U.S. Copyright Office granted it Registered Copyright status on January 21, 2004.

The first tournament was held in 2004. A new tournament category was awarded for the first time in 2007. The trophy for "Best Artificial Intelligence Implementation of Death Stacks" was awarded (in absentia) to an AI programmer nicknamed Freegoldbar for his two versions of the game (one which could be downloaded and installed on a PC, and a flash-player version which could be played online). This category was created to encourage artificial intelligence programmers to tackle the problems of arithmetic logic inherent in this game. In a programming sense this task can be considered more complicated than checkers but less complicated than chess.

== Human championship rankings ==
- 2004 tournament winners: 1st Place, Mark Furr; 2nd Place, Jeff Smith; 3rd Place, Eric Lowman. First prize was $250.00.
- 2005 tournament winners: 1st Place, Chris Jarrett; 2nd Place, Eric Lowman; 3rd Place, Bryan Reese; and tied for 4th place, Chris Ingram & Gerry Baygents. First prize was $250.00.
- 2006 tournament winners: 1st Place, Chris Jarrett; 2nd Place, Bryan Reese; 3rd Place, Eric Lowman. (A 4th Place trophy was also awarded.) First prize was $250.00.
- 2007 tournament winners: 1st Place, Chris Jarrett; 2nd Place, Eric Lowman; 3rd Place, Joey Wong. First prize was $250.00.
- 2008 tournament winners: 1st Place, Chris Jarrett; 2nd Place, Eric Lowman; 3rd Place, Aloysius Trey Krieger. First prize was $250.00.
- 2009 tournament winners: 1st Place, Chris Jarrett; 2nd Place, Aloysius Trey Krieger; 3rd Place, Eric Lowman. First prize was $250.00.
- 2010 tournament winners: 1st Place, Chris Jarrett; 2nd Place, Trey Krieger; 3rd Place, Ray Allen. First prize was $250.00.
- 2011 tournament winners: 1st Place, Chris Jarrett; 2nd Place, Trey Krieger; 3rd Place, Will Harris. First prize was $250.00.
- 2012 tournament winners: 1st Place, Chris Jarrett; 2nd Place, Trey Krieger; 3rd Place, Alex Cardullo; 4th Place, Daniel Lowery. First prize was $260.00.
- 2014 tournament winners: 1st Place, Chris Jarrett; 2nd Place, Beau Collins. First prize was $250.00.
- 2015 tournament winners: Tied for 1st and 2nd Place, Bob Tucker and Ryan Connway (they split the prize money). First prize was $260.00.

== Artificial intelligence championship rankings ==
"Best Artificial Intelligence Implementation of Death Stacks"

- 2007 1st place: Freegoldbar for his two versions of the game (one which could be downloaded and installed on a PC, and a flash-player version which could be played online).
