= Tennis (paper-and-pencil game) =

Abstract strategy game

Tennis is an (abstract) strategic paper-and-pencil game for two players. The game field consists of 4 fields and a centre line. These are called (-2,-1,0,1,2), with negative numbers belonging to player 1, positive to player 2. At start, the ball is at the centre line (0).

Both players start with the same initial number (e.g. 50 points). In each draw, both players choose a number, and the ball is moved towards the player with the smallest number. The number chosen reduces the points for the next draws. The aim of the game is to move the ball beyond the second field of the opponent. The game is described in Das große Buch der Block- und Bleistiftspiele.

== Mathematical description ==
For a simple description, we include the numbers -3 and 3 to denote the ball being beyond the second field. This results in a playfield as (-3,-2,-1,0,1,2,3).

The draw of player i at time t will be denoted as $S_{i,t}$, the ball is at time t in $B_{t}$.

At start is $B_0=0$ and for both players is $S_{i,0}=50$.

Each player chooses a whole number $0\le Z_{i,t}\le S_{i,t-1}$, with $Z_{i,t}=0$ only if $S_{i,t}=0$. The number reduces the points of this player ($S_{i,t}=S_{i,t-1}-Z_{i,t}$).

The ball is moved as follows:

- If $Z_{1,t}>Z_{2,t}$, then the ball is moved towards player 2.
  - If the ball was on a field of player 1, it will be moved over the centre line ($B_t=1$).
  - Otherwise, the ball will be moved one field towards player 2 ($B_{t}=B_{t-1}+1$).
- Symmetrically, the ball will be moved towards player 1 if $Z_{1,t}<Z_{2,t}$.
- If $Z_{1,t}=Z_{2,t}$, the ball remains where it is.

For the result of the game, the following rules apply:

- The game ends if the ball is moved beyond the field of any player, of if both players do not have any points left.
- In both cases, the game is lost for that player on whose side the ball is.
- If the game is played repeatedly, it can be defined to give two win points if the ball is moved beyond the field, otherwise only one point.

== Example games ==
In the first example, player one wins, but the ball is still on the playfield when both players do not have any points left.

| t | Player 1 Draw $Z_{1,t}$ | Player 2 Draw $Z_{2,t}$ | Player 1 Status $S_{1,t}$ | Player 2 Status $S_{2,t}$ | Ball $B_t$ | Comment |
|---|---|---|---|---|---|---|
| 0 | | | 50 | 50 | 0 | Start |
| 1 | 5 | 10 | 45 | 40 | -1 | |
| 2 | 5 | 10 | 40 | 30 | -2 | |
| 3 | 15 | 10 | 25 | 20 | 1 | |
| 4 | 15 | 10 | 10 | 10 | 2 | |
| 5 | 10 | 10 | 0 | 0 | 2 | Player 1 wins |

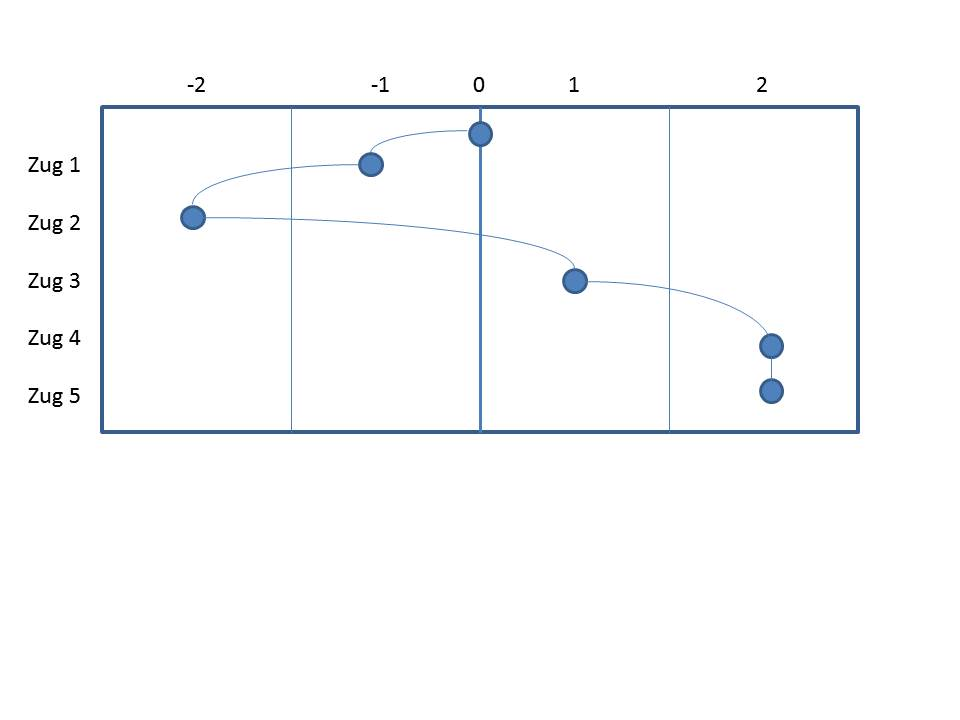

In the second example, player 1 wins again, by hitting the ball beyond the other playfield using the last points he has left.

| t | Player 1 Draw $Z_{1,t}$ | Player 2 Draw $Z_{2,t}$ | Player 1 Status $S_{1,t}$ | Player 2 Status $S_{2,t}$ | Ball $B_t$ | Comment |
|---|---|---|---|---|---|---|
| 0 | | | 50 | 50 | 0 | Start |
| 1 | 11 | 3 | 39 | 47 | 1 | |
| 2 | 1 | 10 | 38 | 37 | -1 | |
| 3 | 15 | 11 | 23 | 26 | 1 | |
| 4 | 1 | 9 | 22 | 17 | -1 | |
| 5 | 3 | 6 | 19 | 11 | -2 | |
| 6 | 11 | 3 | 8 | 8 | 1 | |
| 7 | 4 | 3 | 4 | 5 | 2 | |
| 8 | 1 | 5 | 3 | 0 | -1 | |
| 9 | 2 | 0 | 1 | 0 | 1 | |
| 10 | 1 | 0 | 1 | 0 | 2 | |
| 11 | 1 | 0 | 0 | 0 | 3 | Player 1 wins |

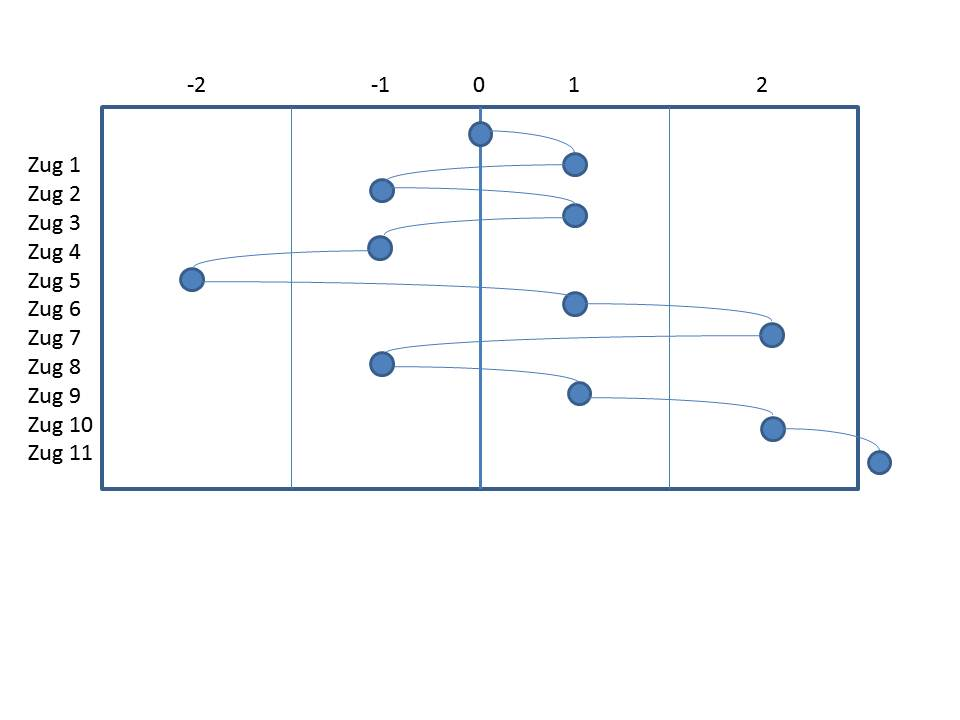
