= Deal Me In =

Board game

Deal Me In is a board game published in 1988 by Noraut.

== Contents ==
Deal Me In is a game in which players form poker hands with scores on a board with an 11 by 11 matrix.

== Reception ==
Philip A Murphy reviewed Deal Me In for Games International magazine, and gave it 4 stars out of 5, and stated that "the game is a must, especially for Scrabble and Poker fans, and for those who like a family game where, despite heavy competition from the wife and kids, dad can be sure his superior skill will carry the day!"
