= Nations: A Simulation Game in International Politics =

Cover art, 1995

Nations: A Simulation Game in International Politics is a 1995 case study available from the Institute for the Study of Diplomacy (School of Foreign Service) at Georgetown University, written by Michael Herzig and David Skidmore in the form of classroom game that is designed to give the students some understanding of international relations theory.

== Rules ==
The game is set on the fictional continent of Lostralia, which has a neutral zone and seven countries: Spartonia, Bampff, Holy Zott, Pyrote, Libertania, Zamboni, and Crock. Each country has specified resources, cities, and problems, as well as a defined national identity and national objectives, and a set amount of resources. Students are divided into teams, each representing one of the seven countries. Each team is given a set of problems to solve, and must also obtain a certain amount of resources. Due to the needs of each nation and the problems each one is trying to solve, the teams find themselves competing with each other, and must solve these issues using diplomacy, trade, or other strategies. As Stephen Fuchs of St. Joseph's College, New York states, "The challenge is to achieve your national objectives without compromising your nation’s identity."

Although the game is designed for university students, it has been played by elementary school students.

== Critical reception ==
In the paper IR Teaching Reloaded: Using Films and Simulations in the Teaching of International Relations, Archie Simpson (University of Bath) and Bernie Kaussler (James Madison University) concluded that role-playing, films, and simulations like Nations: A Simulation Game in International Politics used in the teaching of international relations "can aid student learning especially in terms of IR theory."

Stephen Fuchs, in the paper Dumping the Dead Folks: Teaching U.S. Foreign Relations, talks about the important place this game plays in the final three days of his college course, "U.S. Foreign Relations since 1920". Fuchs says of this game, "I have not found another teaching device that reinforces as many of my course objectives as Nations does. Nations challenges students to identify the major issues and questions affecting their own nation and to place them in an international context. [...] What becomes apparent in our debriefing session is that the students and teams who best understand and negotiate the fault lines of domestic policy and international relations generally win the game. Analytical, communication, and negotiation skills figure prominently."
