= Diaballik =

Abstract strategy board game

Crosstrack
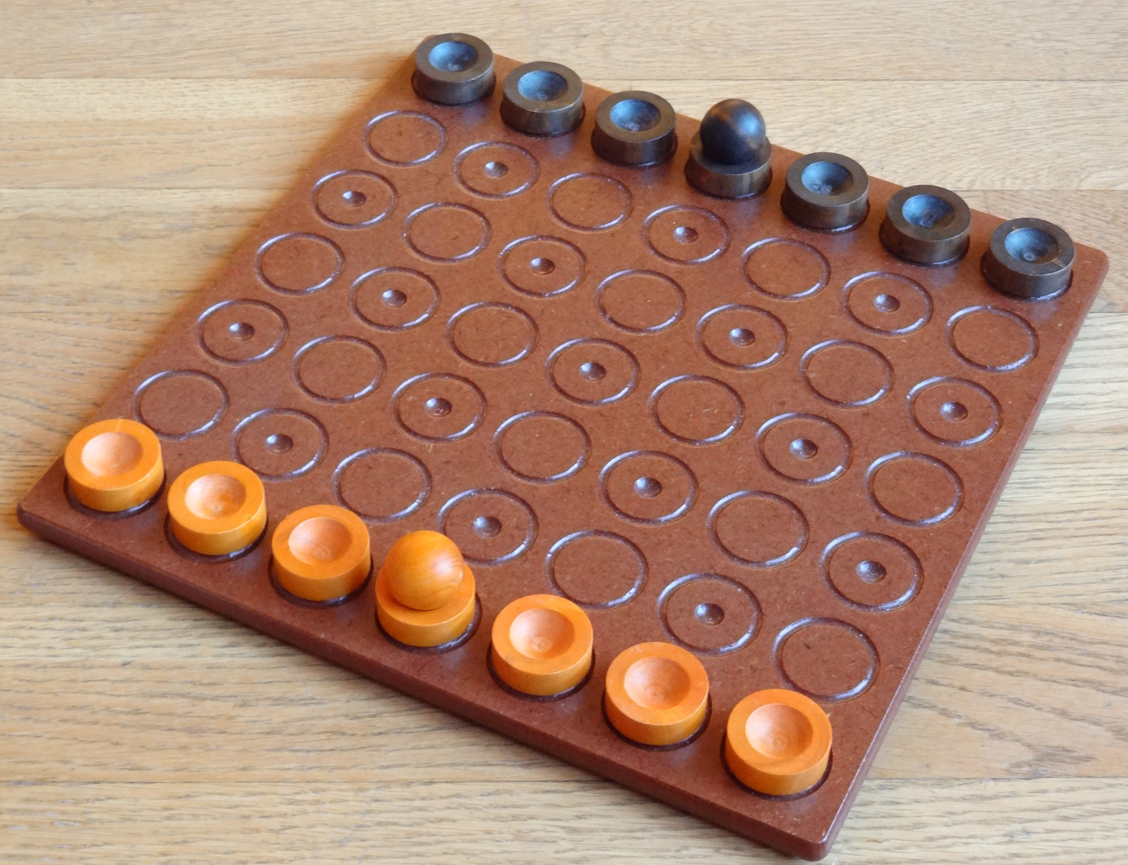
- Screenshot of the game
- Players: 2
- Setup time: 30 seconds
- Playing time: 20 minutes
- Chance: None
- Age range: 8+
- Skills: Tactics, Strategy

Diaballik is an abstract strategy board game designed by Philippe Lefrançois. It attempts to simulate a sport wherein two teams are simultaneously trying to get their ball to the opposite team's goal line. The board depicts a 7x7 grid.

== Rules ==
Diaballik's rules are simple. Each opponent has a team composed of seven players, one of which has a ball. There is no mechanism to remove players, so there are always 14 players in the game.

The goal of the game is to bring a player to the opponent's side with the ball.

Opponents take turns and can optionally take three actions during their turn in any order: two moves and one ball throw. A move is to move one player just one horizontal or vertical space.

The player with the ball can throw his ball to another player of his team who is located in the vertical line, the horizontal line or a diagonal line and if no opposing player is in the way. As in handball, the player with the ball cannot move while he has the ball. So to move, the ball holder must pass to one of his partners. Moves can only be made in the horizontal or vertical direction and only if the destination is unoccupied. Moving diagonally requires two moves, since one must move horizontally, then vertically, in two stages (as such one cannot move diagonally between two pieces).

=== Anti-game rule ===
Opponents need to bring at least one of their players to the other side. If all players of a team are adjacent, one per column, the adverse team cannot reach the adverse side, because they form an uncrossable line. The "anti-game" rule dissuades opponents to make an uncrossable line. In practice the "anti-game" rule specifies that if an opponent puts its players in an uncrossable line and at least three opposing players are adjacent to this line, then the opponent players wins.

== Variant ==
With the variant configuration, it is possible to attack very quickly.

== Strategy ==
At each turn, the number of possible actions averages between 200 and 1,000. To win it is essential to attack but it is also crucial to defend from the opponent's attacks.
