= Camelot (board game) =

Board game designed by George S. Parker

	a	b	c	d	e	f	g	h	i	j	k	l
16	a16 w w	b16 w w	c16 w w	d16 w w	e16 w w	f16	g16	h16 w w	i16 w w	j16 w w	k16 w w	l16 w w	16
15	a15 w w	b15 w w	c15	d15	e15	f15	g15	h15	i15	j15	k15 w w	l15 w w	15
14	a14 w w	b14	c14	d14	e14	f14	g14	h14	i14	j14	k14	l14 w w	14
13	a13	b13	c13	d13	e13	f13	g13	h13	i13	j13	k13	l13	13
12	a12	b12	c12	d12	e12	f12	g12	h12	i12	j12	k12	l12	12
11	a11	b11	c11 black knight	d11 black pawn	e11 black pawn	f11 black pawn	g11 black pawn	h11 black pawn	i11 black pawn	j11 black knight	k11	l11	11
10	a10	b10	c10	d10 black knight	e10 black pawn	f10 black pawn	g10 black pawn	h10 black pawn	i10 black knight	j10	k10	l10	10
9	a9	b9	c9	d9	e9	f9	g9	h9	i9	j9	k9	l9	9
8	a8	b8	c8	d8	e8	f8	g8	h8	i8	j8	k8	l8	8
7	a7	b7	c7	d7 white knight	e7 white pawn	f7 white pawn	g7 white pawn	h7 white pawn	i7 white knight	j7	k7	l7	7
6	a6	b6	c6 white knight	d6 white pawn	e6 white pawn	f6 white pawn	g6 white pawn	h6 white pawn	i6 white pawn	j6 white knight	k6	l6	6
5	a5	b5	c5	d5	e5	f5	g5	h5	i5	j5	k5	l5	5
4	a4	b4	c4	d4	e4	f4	g4	h4	i4	j4	k4	l4	4
3	a3 w w	b3	c3	d3	e3	f3	g3	h3	i3	j3	k3	l3 w w	3
2	a2 w w	b2 w w	c2	d2	e2	f2	g2	h2	i2	j2	k2 w w	l2 w w	2
1	a1 w w	b1 w w	c1 w w	d1 w w	e1 w w	f1	g1	h1 w w	i1 w w	j1 w w	k1 w w	l1 w w	1
	a	b	c	d	e	f	g	h	i	j	k	l
Camelot gameboard and starting position
- Other names: Chivalry; Inside Moves
- Designers: George S. Parker
- Publishers: Parker Brothers, Waddingtons
- Genres: Board game Abstract strategy game
- Players: 2
- Setup time: < 1 minute
- Playing time: ~15 minutes
- Chance: None
- Skills: Highly tactical; some strategy

Camelot is a strategy board game for two players. It was invented by George S. Parker late in the 19th century, and was one of the first games published by Parker Brothers, originally under the name Chivalry.

The game was reissued as "Camelot" in 1930, with reduced size and number of pieces. It flourished through numerous editions and variants, achieving its greatest popularity in the 1930s, and remained in print through the late 1960s. Parker Brothers briefly republished the game in the 1980s under the name Inside Moves. Since then it has been out of print, but retains a core of fans anticipating another revival.

Camelot lacks the extensive theory of chess while remaining highly tactical, making it quicker both to play and to learn.

A World Camelot Federation exists, with free membership, led by Michael W. Nolan. Camelot was featured in Abstract Games magazine in 2001 and 2002.

== History ==
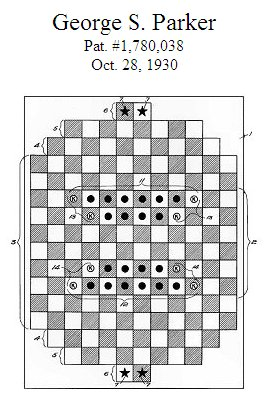
Camelot patent drawing, 1930

In 1882, George S. Parker began working on an abstract board game called Chivalry. His goal was to create a game not so difficult as chess, but considerably more varied than checkers. Parker created a game that was a complex, tactical, but an easily learned and quickly played mixture of Halma and checkers. When finally published by Geo. S. Parker & Co. in 1887, Chivalry won the raves of chess and checkers experts, but the game Parker called "the best game in 2000 years" did not catch on quickly with the general public.

However, Parker never lost his enthusiasm for the game, and in 1930 he made a few changes, and Parker Brothers republished it under the name "Camelot". A few more rules changes followed in 1931. Camelot enjoyed its greatest popularity in the 1930s.

Camelot players included José Raúl Capablanca, World Chess Champion from 1921 to 1927, and Frank Marshall, U.S. Chess Champion from 1907 to 1936. Sidney Lenz and Milton Work, two world-famous bridge players, also played the game.

There were over 50 different editions of Camelot sets issued, including a gold-stamped leather edition and a mahogany cabinet edition. There were tournament editions, regular editions, and low-cost editions. Camelot was eventually discontinued in 1968, then reissued as "Inside Moves" in 1985, and finally discontinued again in 1986. (Note: Due to Camelot's former popularity, vintage copies are often available on eBay and elsewhere. Camelot can also be played on a personal computer using Zillions of Games software.)

Parker Brothers marketed several game variants. Grand Camelot, a variant for four players on a special large board, was released in 1932. Cam, a variant played on a miniature board, came out in 1949. There was also a Point Camelot variant, three-handed and four-handed variants, and even a variant called Camelotta. None of these variants ever achieved the popularity of the basic game.

== Game rules ==
The game is played on a board of 160 squares, which is roughly rectangular (12×14), with three squares removed from each of the four corners, and four extra squares extending outside the main rectangle, two each at the top and bottom of the board. These two-square areas are called the castles. Each player starts the game with fourteen pieces: four knights and ten men, set up as shown (see diagram).

=== Winning ===
The object of the game is to be the first player to occupy the opponent's castle with two of your own pieces, or, to capture all of your opponent's pieces while retaining two or more of your own pieces.

=== Move rules ===
Both knights and men can move either horizontally, vertically, or diagonally in three ways, as follows:

1. One space in any direction (like a king in chess). This is called a plain move.
2. A leaping move (called cantering) over an adjacent friendly piece to a vacant space immediately beyond. Multiple leaps over a player's own pieces are permitted. Cantering is always optional (never obligatory).
3. A jumping move over an adjacent enemy piece to a vacant space immediately beyond. The enemy piece is captured and removed from the board. As in checkers, multiple jumps are allowed, and capturing is obligatory whenever it is possible.

Men may make any of the three moves, but only one type of move per turn. Knights have a fourth option: a combination move consisting of a canter immediately followed by a jump (capture). This is called the knight's charge. The knight may, in this single move, perform multiple canters (or just one), followed by multiple jumps (or just one); but the canter(s) must precede the jump(s). A knight may not combine a plain move with a canter or a jump.

=== Sample game ===
White: Michael Nolan Black: Dan Troyka Event: WCF Camelot World Championship, game 4; March 2009 1. E6-G8 I11-G9 2. H6-J8 I10-G12 3. F6-H8 J11-I11 4. J6-H6 D11-F9? 5. J8-I9?! G12-I10xI8 6. H8xJ8 C11-E9? 7. G8-F8 I11-H12 8. F8-F6 H12-G12 9. J8-I9 H10xJ8? 10. H6-F8xH10xH12xF12xH10 D10-F8xH6xJ6xH8xH6 11. G6xI6 E9-G9xI11 12. I6-I7! J8xH6 13. F7-G7! H6xF8 14. E7xG9xE9xG11xG9 I11-H12 15. G9-F8 H12-G12 16. F6-E7 G12-F12 17. D7-E6? E11-F10 18. C6-D5 F12-G11 19. F8-F7 F11-G10 20. D6-F6 E10-F9 21. D5-D6 G11-H10 22. F6-G7 F9-F11-H9 23. D6-F6 F10-G11 24. G7-H8 H9xH7 25. E6-G8xI6 G11-G9 26. E7-G7 G10-H9 27. I6-H6 G9-I9 28. F7-H7 H10-H8? 29. F6-G6!? H8xF6 30. G6-I8xI10xG8 1–0 (Black resigns?)

== World Camelot Federation ==
The World Camelot Federation (WCF), an international non-profit organization, was formed by Michael Wortley Nolan in 1999 to preserve and popularize the game. The WCF has introduced some rules clarifications, additions, and changes. It organized a Camelot World Championship tournament with twelve participants, which concluded in June 2003, with Dan Troyka of Michigan winning the World Champion title. A new World Championship tournament began in 2008 and concluded in 2009, with Troyka retaining his crown.

=== Official WCF rules ===
==== Players ====
The game of Camelot is played between two opponents who move pieces alternately on a Camelot board. The two players are called White and Black. The players choose for color. White moves first.

==== Playing surface ====
The Camelot board contains 160 squares of identical size. Ranks are rows of squares, numbered 1 through 16, running horizontally from one side of the board to the other. Files are columns of squares, lettered A through L, running vertically from one end of the board to the other. The squares of the board, with their actual Camelot designation used for game notation, from the bottom rank to the top rank, from the left-most file to the right-most file, are: F1, G1, C2, D2, E2, F2, G2, H2, I2, J2, B3, C3, D3, E3, F3, G3, H3, I3, J3, K3, A4, B4, C4, D4, E4, F4, G4, H4, I4, J4, K4, L4, A5, B5, C5, D5, E5, F5, G5, H5, I5, J5, K5, L5, A6, B6, C6, D6, E6, F6, G6, H6, I6, J6, K6, L6, A7, B7, C7, D7, E7, F7, G7, H7, I7, J7, K7, L7, A8, B8, C8, D8, E8, F8, G8, H8, I8, J8, K8, L8, A9, B9, C9, D9, E9, F9, G9, H9, I9, J9, K9, L9, A10, B10, C10, D10, E10, F10, G10, H10, I10, J10, K10, L10, A11, B11, C11, D11, E11, F11, G11, H11, I11, J11, K11, L11, A12, B12, C12, D12, E12, F12, G12, H12, I12, J12, K12, L12, A13, B13, C13, D13, E13, F13, G13, H13, I13, J13, K13, L13, B14, C14, D14, E14, F14, G14, H14, I14, J14, K14, C15, D15, E15, F15, G15, H15, I15, J15, F16, G16. White's Castle is composed of two Castle Squares F1 and G1, and Black's Castle is composed of two Castle Squares F16 and G16.

==== Pieces ====
Each player begins the game with 14 pieces: four Knights and ten Men. The starting positions are: White Knights on C6, D7, I7, and J6, White Men on D6, E6, E7, F6, F7, G6, G7, H6, H7, and I6, Black Knights on C11, D10, I10, and J11, and Black Men on D11, E10, E11, F10, F11, G10, G11, H10, H11, and I11.

==== Moves ====
===== The plain move =====
A piece (either Knight or Man) may move one square in any direction (horizontally, vertically, or diagonally) to any adjoining unoccupied square. This move is called a Plain Move.

===== The canter =====
A piece (either Knight or Man) may leap in any direction (horizontally, vertically, or diagonally) over a friendly piece (either Knight or Man) that occupies an adjoining square, provided that there is an unoccupied square immediately beyond it in a direct line onto which the leap may be made. This move is called a Canter. Pieces cantered over are not removed from the board. A player may canter over more than one piece during the same move, but may not make a Canter that ends on the same square from which it began. When cantering over more than one piece in a move, the direction of the move may be varied after each Canter. A player is never compelled to canter, nor when cantering is he compelled to canter as far as possible.

===== The jump =====
A piece (either Knight or Man) may leap in any direction (horizontally, vertically, or diagonally) over an opposing piece (either Knight or Man) that occupies an adjoining square, provided there is an unoccupied square immediately beyond it in a direct line onto which the leap may be made. This move is called a Jump. Each enemy piece jumped over is captured and immediately removed from the board. A player is obliged to jump if any one of his pieces is next to an exposed enemy piece. Having jumped over one enemy piece, the jumping must continue as a part of that same move if the player's piece reaches a square next to another exposed enemy piece. When jumping over more than one piece, the direction of the move may be varied after each Jump. If presented with capturing alternatives, a player may choose which opposing piece to capture, and with which of his pieces to effect the capture. When compelled to jump, a player may, if he can, capture by a Knight's Charge instead. The only situation in which a player may ignore his obligation to jump is when, on his previous move, he has jumped one of his pieces over an opponent's piece into his own castle, ending his turn there, and must, on his next turn, immediately move that piece out from his castle.

===== The knight's charge =====
A Knight (only) may combine a Canter and a Jump in a single move, called a Knight's Charge. A Knight's Charge must follow the order of first the Canter(s) and last the Jump(s). A Knight is never obliged to make a Knight's Charge. When cantering over more than one piece during the cantering portion of a Knight's Charge, the direction of the move may be varied after each Canter. If the Canter of a Knight brings it next to an enemy piece that can be jumped, it must do so, unless by a different route later in that same move it captures one or more enemy pieces elsewhere. Having jumped over one enemy piece during the jumping portion of a Knight's Charge, the jumping must continue as a part of that same move if the player's Knight reaches a square next to another exposed enemy piece.

==== Notation ====
The Plain Move is indicated by the notation "-" placed between the starting square and the ending square, e.g., C8-D9. The Canter is indicated by the notation "-" placed between the starting square, landed upon intermediate squares (if any), and the ending square, e.g., E6-C8-A8. The Jump is indicated by the notation "x" placed between the starting square, landed upon intermediate squares (if any), and the ending square, e.g., H4xJ4xL6. The Knight's Charge is indicated by the notation "-" placed between the beginning square of the cantering portion, landed upon intermediate squares (if any), and the ending square of the cantering portion, and the notation "x" placed between the ending square of the cantering portion (the beginning square of the jumping portion), landed upon intermediate squares (if any), and the ending square of the jumping portion, e.g., F6-F8-H8xH10xJ12.

==== Object ====
The game is won if a player moves any two of his pieces (Knights and/or Men) into his opponent's castle. Or, the game is won if a player captures all of his opponent's pieces, and has two or more of his own pieces left. Or, the game is won if a player has two or more pieces, and his opponent is unable to make a legal move.

==== Drawn game ====
The game is drawn if both players have no more than one piece left.

==== Player's own castle ====
A player may not plain-move or canter one of his pieces (Knight or Man) into his own castle. If an enemy piece reaches a square adjacent to his own castle, a player may jump, or make the jumping portion of a Knight's Charge, over that enemy piece into his own castle. A player may not, during the cantering portion of a Knight's Charge, move his Knight into his own castle. If a player jumps over an opponent's piece into his own castle, and the player's piece is then next to an exposed enemy piece, the jumping must continue (out of his own castle) as part of that same move. A player who has jumped one of his pieces over an opponent's piece into his own castle, and in so doing was unable to continue the jumping out of his own castle as part of that same move, must, on his next turn to move, immediately move that piece out from his own castle, with no exception. A player moving one of his pieces out from his own castle must jump out, if possible, instead of plain-moving or cantering out. If a player has the opportunity to jump out from his own castle, he may, if he can, satisfy the obligation to capture by means of moving out with a Knight's Charge instead.

==== Opponent's castle ====
A piece that has entered his opponent's castle cannot come out, but is allowed to move from one castle square to the other (designated a castle move). A player is limited to two castle moves during a game.
