= Shatra (game) =

Chess-like game played in Altai region

	a	b	c	d	e	f	g
14			c14	d14	e14			14
13			c13	d13	e13			13
12			c12	d12	e12			12
11				d11 (temdek)				11
10	a10	b10	c10	d10	e10	f10	g10	10
9	a9	b9	c9	d9	e9	f9	g9	9
8	a8	b8	c8	d8	e8	f8	g8	8
7	a7	b7	c7	d7	e7	f7	g7	7
6	a6	b6	c6	d6	e6	f6	g6	6
5	a5	b5	c5	d5	e5	f5	g5	5
4				d4 (temdek)				4
3			c3	d3	e3			3
2			c2	d2	e2			2
1			c1	d1	e1			1
	a	b	c	d	e	f	g
Board with placed pieces in their starting positions. The ditch is marked as bold line, the temdek is indicated by a red square.
- Genres: Board game Abstract strategy game
- Players: 2
- Setup time: <1 minute
- Playing time: 30 minutes – 2 hours
- Chance: None
- Age range: 7+
- Skills: Strategy, tactics

Shatra is a chess-like game which was played in the Altai region. It can be seen as a mixture between chess and draughts.

== General rules ==
Shatra is played on board of 62 tiles which are divided into 3 areas: The central area of 7x6 tiles and two 3x3 tiles (fortresses), which are connected via 1 tile (temdek) to the central board. The central area is divided horizontally by a ditch. Each player has 1 king, 1 queen, 2 rooks, 2 bishops and 11 pawns (shatras). The pieces move as in chess. The pieces placed in the fortress are called reserves and are unable to be moved. Instead they can be placed on any free tile of the board on the own site of the central board (reaching from the temdek to the central ditch) at any given time. Dropping a piece from the fortress onto the central board ends the turn of the player. If a piece within the fortress makes a capture, it has to be moved to the own site of the board in the next round. Vacation of the fortress leads to the removal of the respective temdek, allowing captures from the field back into the fortress. The only piece that can move independently from the temdek is the king.

The ditch in the central board is used as marker: if shatras cross the ditch, they can be moved like kings.

Pieces are captured like in draughts by "jumping over an adjacent piece to an empty square immediately beyond". Thereby, shatras and the king perform a so called "short leap", meaning they can only jump over pieces directly adjacent to them, while queens, rooks and bishops are able to perform a "long leap", meaning they can "move over any number of vacant squares and leap over an opposing man to any vacant square beyond". Capturing is compulsory for every piece except the king, meaning that every capture that is possible has to be performed. If after capturing a second capture is possible at the new position, it also has to be performed. If the new position allows multiple pathways to capture opposing tiles, the path leading to most captures has to be chosen. One piece cannot be jumped over in a multiple capture scenario. If a shatra promotes after a capture, it has to continue capturing as the promoted piece if that allows more captures.

Goal of the game is to capture or stalemate the opposing king.

== Pieces & movement patterns ==
Piece	Symbol	Movement
Shatra		a5 / b5 / c5 / d5 / e5; a4 / b4 / c4 black circle / d4 / e4; a3 / b3 / c3 white pawn / d3 / e3; a2 / b2 / c2 / d2 / e2; a1 / b1 / c1 / d1 / e1
King		a5 / b5 / c5 / d5 / e5; a4 / b4 / c4 black circle / d4 / e4; a3 / b3 black circle / c3 white king / d3 black circle / e3; a2 / b2 / c2 black circle / d2 / e2; a1 / b1 / c1 / d1 / e1
Queen		a5 up-left arrow / b5 / c5 up arrow / d5 / e5 up-right arrow; a4 / b4 up-left arrow / c4 up arrow / d4 up-right arrow / e4; a3 left arrow / b3 left arrow / c3 white queen / d3 right arrow / e3 right arrow; a2 / b2 down-left arrow / c2 down arrow / d2 down-right arrow / e2; a1 down-left arrow / b1 / c1 down arrow / d1 / e1 down-right arrow
Rook		a5 / b5 / c5 up arrow / d5 / e5; a4 / b4 / c4 up arrow / d4 / e4; a3 left arrow / b3 left arrow / c3 white rook / d3 right arrow / e3 right arrow; a2 / b2 / c2 down arrow / d2 / e2; a1 / b1 / c1 down arrow / d1 / e1
Bishop		a5 up-left arrow / b5 / c5 / d5 / e5 up-right arrow; a4 / b4 up-left arrow / c4 / d4 up-right arrow / e4; a3 / b3 / c3 white bishop / d3 / e3; a2 / b2 down-left arrow / c2 / d2 down-right arrow / e2; a1 down-left arrow / b1 / c1 / d1 / e1 down-right arrow
