= Quod (board game) =

Abstract strategy board game

Quod is an abstract strategy game played on an 11-by-11 grid of spaces with the four corner spaces removed. Players alternate placing pieces, called quods, into empty spaces. A player wins by placing four quods that form the four corners of a square. The square can be any size and any orientation (in other words, the square can be "tilted"). In addition, each player has a small number of pieces, called quasars, that are used purely for blocking. Quod was invented by G. Keith Still (www.GKStill.com) in 1979, while he was at college, and was popularized by Scientific American in March 1996. Usually, each player begins with 20 quods and 8 quasars.

Quod can be played as a paper-and-pencil game, or as a board game. There are several computer implementations of this game.
