= Choko (game) =

West African board game

- Genres: Board game; Abstract strategy game
- Players: 2
- Skills: Strategy, tactics

Choko is a two-player abstract strategy board game from Gambia Valley, West Africa. It is played specifically by the Mandinka and Fula tribes. It is related to Yote.

== Goal ==
The goal of choko is for a player to capture all the pieces of an opponent.

== Equipment ==
5×5 holes set in the ground or on a board. Each player has 12 pieces. One plays the white pieces, and the other plays the black pieces; however, any two colors or distinguishable objects will suffice.

== Rules and gameplay ==
1. The board is empty in the beginning. Players decide what colors to play, and who starts first. Players alternate their turns.
2. Players first drop their pieces. They drop one piece per turn.
3. The first player drops their first piece anywhere on the board. The first player has the drop initiative. It is not necessary to drop on every turn, but as long as the first player continues to drop, then so does the second player.
  If the first player decides to make a move (non-capturing move or capturing move), then the second player has the option to drop or move. If the second player decides to drop, then he or she has the drop initiative until he or she decides to move. This means that the first player must continue to drop as long as the second player continues to drop.
  However, if the second player had made a move instead, then the first player has the option to drop or move, and has the drop initiative.
4. In a non-capturing move, pieces can move orthogonally one space per turn. Only one piece can be moved per turn.
5. In a capturing move, pieces capture similarly as in draughts by the short leap, except they must capture orthogonally (not diagonally). The player's piece must be adjacent to the enemy piece, and leap over it onto a vacant space on the other side. Only one leap is allowed, and therefore only one capture by this method is allowed. The player, however, is to take another enemy piece from anywhere on the board. Therefore, in a capturing move, two enemy pieces are taken each time.
6. After all pieces have been dropped, the second player moves first.

== See also ==
- Alquerque
- Yote
