= Seega (game) =

Abstract strategy game

a5 white circle	b5 black circle	c5 white circle	d5 black circle	e5 white circle
a4 black circle	b4 white circle	c4 black circle	d4 white circle	e4 black circle
a3 white circle	b3 black circle	c3	d3 black circle	e3 white circle
a2 black circle	b2 white circle	c2 white circle	d2 black circle	e2 black circle
a1 white circle	b1 black circle	c1 white circle	d1 black circle	e1 white circle
Board after the positioning stage is complete
- Genres: Board game Abstract strategy game Mind sport
- Players: 2

Seega is an abstract strategy game that originated in Egypt. It can be played on boards with cells in a 5×5, 7×7 or 9×9 disposition. Other names include Seejeh, Seeza, Seezeh, Seja, Cheza, Chesa, Siga and Sidjah.

The board starts out empty, and players take turns placing two pieces in any empty cells, excluding the center cell. Then, players move their pieces trying to bound their opponent's pieces to remove them.

The game has been described in literature since at least 1836.

== Rules ==
The game is played by two players, one with dark pieces and the other with clear pieces. Both start with the same number of pieces, equal to half the number of cells in the board minus one cell. Therefore, if the board has 25 cells, each player starts with 12 pieces. If the board has 49 cells, each player starts with 24 pieces. Some Seega boards have an X in the center cell.

Similar to Yoté, the Seega board starts empty, and players may place their pieces in the cells of their own choice.

The game has two stages. In the first, the positioning stage, players place their pieces in the board cells, and cannot place any piece in the center cell. In each turn, each player places two pieces, until they have placed all their pieces.

In the second stage, the moving stage, players move their pieces and capture their opponent's pieces. The first move of player 1 must be moving a piece to the center of the board. Pieces can be moved horizontally or vertically, never diagonally, and cannot jump over other pieces.

To capture a piece, a player must move one of their pieces in such way as to "bound" an opponent piece in one way (either vertically or horizontally). That is, if moving a dark piece results in a clear piece having a dark piece to its right and to its left (that is, the piece that has just been moved and another one), the clear piece will be removed. Same thing happens if the clear piece has a dark piece below and above it. If a player places one of its pieces between two opponent's pieces, nothing happens: captures only occur when a player bounds the pieces of the opponent.

After capturing an opponent's piece, the player can move again if that results in another capture.

=== Variants ===
There are many rules that describe what happens if a player can not move a piece. In one variant, the player can skip their turn, and their opponent plays again. In another, the player that can't make a move can make their opponent remove a piece that will allow the player to make a move. In another one, the player that can't make a move loses the game, except if it happens immediately after the first move of player one. That is, if after player 1 moves for the first time leaving player 2 with no moves, player 1 must remove one of its pieces adjacent to the cell which the first piece moved came from, so that player 2 can move. In another variant, it is player 2 that chooses which piece from player 1 will be removed.

In some versions, the game is over when one player has only one piece left. In others, the game is only over when one player has lost their final piece.

== History ==
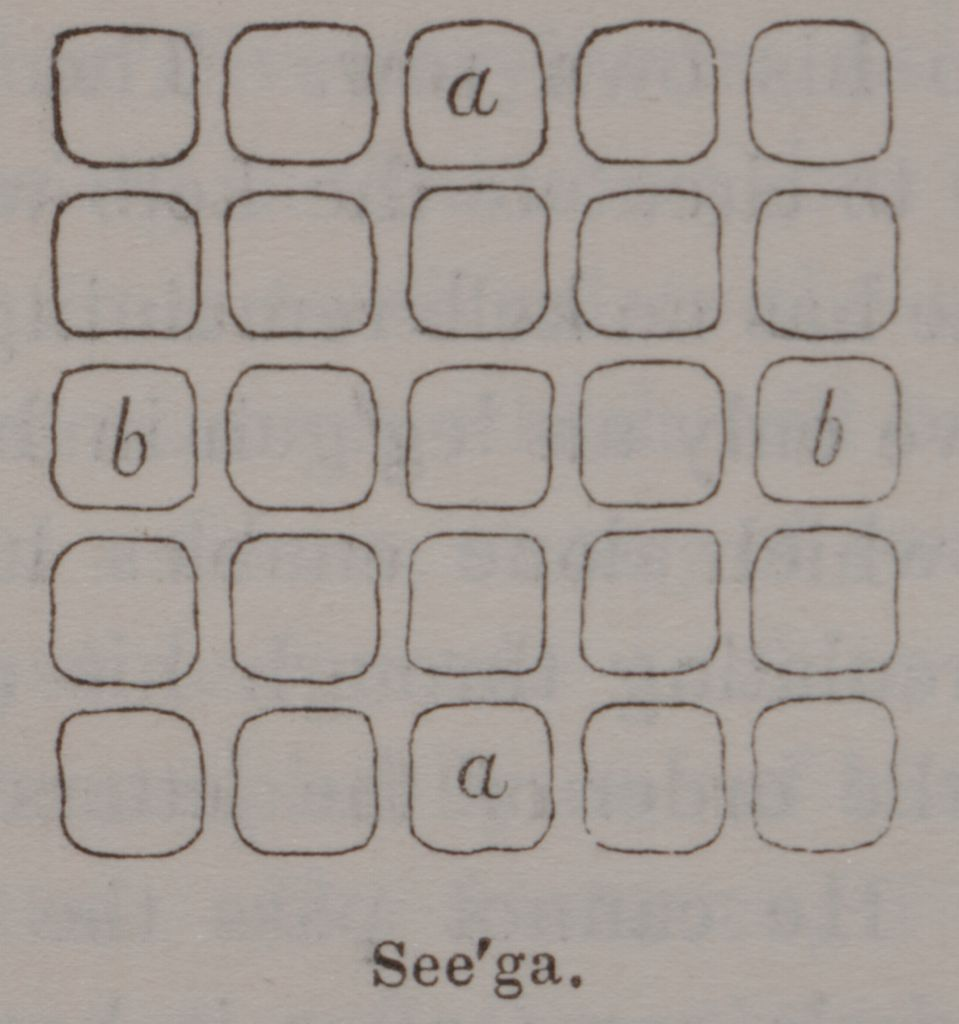
Drawing of a board of "khamsáwee seega" in Lane's book. According to Lane, the first player's first move must be to place their pieces in cells marked with "a", and the second player in cells marked with "b". The following pieces are free to be placed anywhere.

The book An Account Of The Manners And Customs Of The Modern Egyptians (1st edition from 1836) by Edward William Lane mentions the game. According to him, the 5×5 board is called "khamsáwee seega", the 7×7 board is called "seb'áwee", and the 9×9 board is called "tisáwee". The first move of each player is predetermined, as described in the image. The board and game of Seega must not be confused with the board and game called "táb" (also called "Seega") which has four rows of nine to fifteen cells, and is also described by Lane.

Another mention of the game is from an 1890 paper published in the Journal of American Folklore. In the paper, H. Carrington Bolton says he was camping by Mount Sinai and saw Egyptians and bedouins playing in holes dug in the sand. Bolton describes variants with 5×5, 7×7 and 9×9 cells. According to him, the game was called "seegà", and the pieces "kelb".

== See also ==
- Polis (board game)
- Senet
