= Mak-yek =

Board game

Position: a8 black circle, b8 black circle, c8 black circle, d8 black circle, e8 black circle, f8 black circle, g8 black circle, h8 black circle, a6 black circle, b6 black circle, c6 black circle, d6 black circle, e6 black circle, f6 black circle, g6 black circle, h6 black circle, a3 white circle, b3 white circle, c3 white circle, d3 white circle, e3 white circle, f3 white circle, g3 white circle, h3 white circle, a1 white circle, b1 white circle, c1 white circle, d1 white circle, e1 white circle, f1 white circle, g1 white circle, h1 white circle

Diagram 1: Starting positions for Mak-yek

Mak-yek (Thai: หมากแยก, RTGS: mak yaek) is a two-player abstract strategy board game played in Thailand and Myanmar. Players move their pieces as in the rook in chess and attempt to capture their opponent's pieces through custodian and intervention capture. The game may have been first described in literature by Captain James Low a writing contributor in the 1839 work Asiatic Researches; or, Transactions of the Society, Instituted in Bengal, For Inquiring into The History, The Antiquities, The Arts and Sciences, and Literature of Asian, Second Part of the Twentieth Volume in which he wrote chapter X On Siamese Literature and documented the game as Maak yék. Another early description of the game is by H.J.R. Murray in his 1913 work A History of Chess, and the game was written as Maak-yek. (Note: see footnote 15 on page 114 of "A History of Chess"(1913) by H.J.R. Murray.)

== Setup ==
The game is played on an 8 by 8 square board by two players each having a set of sixteen pieces or "men", and with each set distinguishable from the other by color or design.

Men are laid out on the first and third row from the player. (Note: It is the same setup arrangement as in Makruk (also known as Thai Chess), and Ouk Chatrang (also known as Ok or Cambodian Chess).)

== Rules ==
Position: e7 black circle, f7 one, g7 black circle, c6 black circle, f6 up arrow, a5 white circle, b5 black circle, c5 four, d5 left arrow, e5 left arrow, f5 white circle, g5 right arrow, h5 two, c4 black circle, f4 down arrow, h4 black circle, d3 white circle, e3 black circle, f3 three, h3 white circle, f2 black circle, f1 white circle

Diagram 2: A game of Mak-yek or Apit-sodok in progress, and there are four different capturing options for the white piece on f5.

Move to square 1: Intervention capture

Move to square 2: Custodian capture

Move to square 3: Two custodian captures

Move to square 4: Intervention and custodian capture

- There is no special way of deciding who starts the game.
- Players take turns moving one of their men horizontally or vertically like the rook in chess (i.e. not through pieces), capturing the opponent's pieces through custodian capture and intervention capture. The captured pieces are removed immediately from the board.
- Intervention capture is the opposite of custodian. If a piece moves between two enemy pieces that are one square apart on a row or column, it captures both pieces.
- If both an intervention and custodian capture overlap in 1 line or column, the custodian capture takes precedence.
- The first player with no pieces left loses.

== Variants ==
Position: a8 black circle, b8 black circle, c8 black circle, d8 black circle, e8 black circle, f8 black circle, g8 black circle, h8 black circle, a7 black circle, b7 black circle, c7 black circle, d7 black circle, e7 black circle, f7 black circle, g7 black circle, h7 black circle, a2 white circle, b2 white circle, c2 white circle, d2 white circle, e2 white circle, f2 white circle, g2 white circle, h2 white circle, a1 white circle, b1 white circle, c1 white circle, d1 white circle, e1 white circle, f1 white circle, g1 white circle, h1 white circle

Diagram 3: Possible starting positions for Apit-sodok based on Raja Samusah's description in his article The Malay Game of Apit (1932).

Position: g8 black circle, h8 white circle, g7 black circle, h7 four, b6 white circle, f6 white circle, h6 up arrow, b5 three, c5 left arrow, d5 two, e5 left arrow, f5 one, g5 left arrow, h5 black circle, b4 white circle, d4 white circle, f4 white circle, g4 white circle, b3 white circle, d3 white circle, g3 black circle, b2 black circle, d2 white circle, e2 black circle, f2 right arrow, g2 five, d1 black circle, g1 white circle

Diagram 4: A game of Apit-sodok in progress (rules according to Raja Samusah's description). The black piece on h5 has only three capturing options.

Move to square 1: Intervention capture

Move to square 2: Custodian capture of a line of three white pieces

Move to square 3: Outcome is uncertain. If intervention capture is utilized, then only the two white pieces adjacent to square 3 are captured, and the white piece on b3 should be safe. But if custodian capture is utilized, then white pieces on b3 and b4 are captured, but the white piece on b6 should be safe. Another possibility is that all three white pieces are captured.

Move to square 4: The white piece at the upper-right corner is not captured despite being fully surrounded by black pieces.

If the black piece on e2 moves to square 5, it is not captured, nor is the black piece on g3 since the capturing attempt was not initiated by White.

Position: a8 black circle, b8 black circle, c8 black circle, d8 black circle, e8 black circle, f8 black circle, g8 black circle, h7 black king, a6 black circle, b6 black circle, c6 black circle, d6 black circle, e6 black circle, f6 black circle, g6 black circle, h6 black circle, a3 white circle, b3 white circle, c3 white circle, d3 white circle, e3 white circle, f3 white circle, g3 white circle, h3 white circle, a2 white king, b1 white circle, c1 white circle, d1 white circle, e1 white circle, f1 white circle, g1 white circle, h1 white circle

Diagram 5: One of two possible starting positions for Rek and Min Rek Chanh

Position: a8 black circle, b8 black circle, c8 black circle, d8 white circle, e8 black circle, f8 white circle, a7 black circle, b7 black circle, c7 white circle, e7 two, a6 black circle, b6 white circle, e6 up arrow, g6 black king, a5 three, b5 left arrow, c5 left arrow, d5 left arrow, e5 white circle, f5 right arrow, g5 four, a4 up arrow, e4 down arrow, g4 black circle, a3 up arrow, e3 one, a2 white king, d2 white circle, e2 black circle, f2 white circle, e1 white circle

Diagram 6: A Rek match in progress. There are four different capturing options for the white piece on e5. Obviously moving to the square marked number 4 is the best choice as it captures the black king through intervention thus securing the win. The white king on a2 can also move orthognally any number of unoccupied spaces, but it only has one capturing option.

=== Apit-sodok ===
A Malaysian variant called Apit-sodok is closely related. The game is documented in R.J. Wilkinson's work Papers on Malay Subjects (1910), and Raja Samusah's article The Malay Game of Apit (1932), and both refer to the game as Apit. Samusah also refers to the game as Sodok Apit. Both authors describe custodian and intervention capture, but only Samusah describes orthogonal movement of pieces as in the rook in chess. Samusah specifically describes that a line of enemy pieces can be captured through custodian whereas in Mak-yek only a single enemy piece may be captured. But Captain James Low's description of Maak yék does include custodian capture for a line of enemy pieces. Samusah describes that a corner piece cannot be captured by surrounding it on its two adjacent squares and the diagonally adjacent square. He also describes that a piece can move safely next to a friendly piece(s) (on a row or column) despite being flanked as a linear group on two opposite ends by opposing pieces provided there are no spaces between any of them (friendly and opposing pieces). Both Wilkinson and Samusah agree that the game is played on a draughts board, and Samusah specifically illustrates an 8 x 8 uncheckered board similar to most versions of Mak-yek. Samusah describes that "There are 16 pieces, all of equal value; and these are arranged in two rows as in chess", but does not specifically reference the chess variant. Malaysia's chess variant is called Main Chator, and the pieces are set up on the first two rows nearest each player similar to Western chess. (Note: see page 99 of "A History of Chess" (1913) by H.J.R. Murray which states "At the commencement of the game the chessmen are arranged as in the Indian game (diagram, p.80)...", and on page 80 the pieces of the modern Indian Chess are set up on the first two rows nearest each player.) This is a contrast as to how Mak-yek's pieces are initially set up which are on the first and third row nearest each player. As an English translation from the Malay language, apit means squeezed, and this is associated with custodian capture. Sodok means a shovel or spade or a duck's bill, or the process of shoveling up, and this is associated with intervention capture.

=== Rek ===
A similar game is also played in Cambodia called Rek. The game is played on an 8 x 8 uncheckered square board with each player having 16 pieces similar to Mak-yek and Apit-sodok. One of the 16 pieces is a king, and the other 15 pieces are called men. The kings should be of the same color as their respective men, but distinguishable by size or design from them. The game begins with the 15 men situated on the first and third row (somewhat similar to Mak-yek) with only 7 men on the first row and 8 men on the third row. Each player's king is situated on the very far left (or very far right) square of their respective second rows. The first row square directly below each king is left vacant. All pieces including the king move orthogonally any number of unobstructed squares on the board as in the rook of chess. The objective of each player is to capture the other player's king. It thus resembles chess in this respect. It is not an elimination game as in Mak-yek and Apit-sodok, although elimination of all pieces does imply capture of the other player's king. Intervention capture is the same as in Mak-yek and Apit-sodok, and it is called Rek from which the name of the game is derived from. A type of custodian capture is also featured in the game, but unlike Mak-yek and Apit-sodok where a player only has to flank the opponent's piece(s) on two opposite sides, it requires the player performing the capture to completely surround an opponent's piece or group of pieces with or without the aid of the edge(s) of the board, and in such a way that the pieces being captured cannot perform a legal move (hypothetically on the opponent's next turn). Rek is a transitive verb which means "carry on one's shoulder a pole at each end of which is a container, bundle or object", and the two containers at each end of the pole are symbolic of the two pieces captured through intervention and are carried away by the player performing the capture. Rek is pronounced like rake but the k is silent. Another variant called Min Rek Chanh is also similarly related.

=== Gala ===
Another game that employs custodian capture is Gala from Sulawesi (formerly called Celebes), an island of Indonesia. The game was described by Harold James Ruthven Murray in A History of Board-Games Other Than Chess (1952) in which he references Walter Kaudern's Ethnographical studies in Celebes: Results of the author’s expedition to Celebes 1917–20, vol. 4: Games and dances in Celebes. (1929) as his source, and Walter Kaudern in turn references Benjamin Frederik Matthes' "Makassaarsch-Hollandsch Woordenboe" (1859) and Ethnographische Atlas (1859) as his sources which are written in Dutch. Kaudern makes no attempt to translate the description and rules of the game from Matthes, and simply copies verbatim the passage from Matthes' book along with a diagram of the board. Murray attempts to describe it in English, although there may be a slight discrepancy with that of Matthe's, but Matthe's description may be unclear in some areas. Murray describes it as a two-player game played on a 7 x 7 square board of which the central square is marked with an X (or a cross) along with the middle square of each edge row (there are four edge rows, and they are the top-most and bottom-most ranks, and the left-most and right-most files of the board). This would describe a board containing five X's. However, in Kaudern's diagram of the board which is based upon Matthes', there are nine X's to be found on the board. The other four X's are to be found on the four corner squares of the board. One player plays 10 black pieces, and the other player plays with 13 white pieces. The game begins with an empty board. Black moves first and places one piece on the central square (which is called the soelisañgka by the Bugis people of Sulawesi). Murray states that play continues with each player alternating their turns placing one of their pieces on their half of the board (Matthes does not specifically mention that pieces are entered one at a time, although that may have been his intent). (Note: Since White moves second, White has three remaining pieces left when Black has dropped all of its pieces on the board, but neither Murray or Matthes describe how those remaining three pieces are placed. Does White continue to drop them one piece per turn (which allows Black to move his pieces three times before White is able to), or are all three dropped in one turn, or is there another procedure?) Matthes specifically mentions that a player's piece cannot be moved to the opponent's half of the board until all of their pieces have been entered on the board. Murray describes that pieces move orthogonally any number of unoccupied spaces as in the Rook in Chess, and never diagonally. (Note: This may be a correct interpretation of Matthes' rule, although another interpretation of Matthes' wording may be that the pieces are placed in a straight line and never in the cross (perhaps squares that are marked with an X), but if this were the case, then Matthes' makes no attempt to describe the movement capabilities of the pieces. Murray states that this board is also used for a race-game, and the squares marked with an X (with the exception of the central square) may not have any function in Gala.) Murray describes that pieces are captured by interception (custodian method) in which a single enemy piece is flanked on two orthogonally opposite sides by two pieces of the player performing the capture. Murray states that when one player has hemmed in all of the other player's pieces, that is, the other player's pieces are prevented from performing a legal move on their turn, the situation is called a "pōle" by the Bugis, and "bāttoe-mi nāi" by the Makassars of Sulawesi.

Gala should not be confused by another game of the same name which is a chess variant played in Northern Germany.

=== Hos Nip ===
"Hos" is a Thai checkers or Thai draught that use 8 x 8 eyes board with 8 pieces per team. Hos Nip (ฮอสหนีบ) or Maknip (หมากหนีบ) is a kind of Nipped Draught game that the setting up by using a row per team at the first and last far row on the board. The rule similar to Makyaek (หมากแยก).

== Second version of Mak-yek ==
Both Captain James Low and H.J.R. Murray described a second version of Mak-yek which resembles more of a hunt game where one player possesses only one piece, and goes against another player with sixteen pieces. The player with one piece can move in any direction except diagonally, and capture a single enemy piece by leaping over it as long as there is an empty square behind it. No more detail of the game's rules is provided, but it does appear that the game is played on the same 8 x 8 square board since both authors make no attempt to describe a different board. If it is not the same board, it is at the very least a square board of some dimension since both authors describe that the single piece can leap over one of the sixteen pieces provided it lands on an empty square behind the leapt piece. If this is indeed a hunt game, it is a contrast to most hunt games from around the world and especially in Southeast Asia where most hunt game boards are of a linear pattern. It also would not be a variant of the first version of Mak-yek which is definitely not a hunt game.

== Classification ==
Mak-yek, Apit-sodok, Rek, and Min Rek Chanh are all played on an 8 × 8 square board with each player having sixteen pieces, exhibit intervention capture and custodian capture (or a modified custodian in the case of Rek and Min Rek Chanh), and pieces move like the Rook in Chess with the exception of the kings in Min Rek Chanh; furthermore, captured pieces are immediately removed from the board (as opposed to being converted into the capturing player's pieces as in Ming Mang and a few others). These commonalities suggest that they may form a subfamily within the family of games that also includes Jul-Gonu, Hasami shogi, Dai hasami shogi, Ming Mang, Gundru, Seega, Ludus latrunculorum, Petteia, and Firdawsi’s Nard. They also bear resemblance to the Tafl games which exhibit custodian capture and rook-like movement of pieces except that the Tafl games are asymmetrical in the number and type of pieces each player possess, and the objective in Tafl games is for one player to move their king to the edge of the board with the objective of the other player to capture that king. They distantly resemble Agon, Awithlaknakwe, Bizingo, Watermelon Chess, Reversi, and Othello as all of these games exhibit custodian capture or some form of it. They may also distantly resemble Wéiqí, Baduk, and Go as these games also have a capturing method resembling custodian.

Rek and Min Rek Chanh's "custodian" capturing method resembles that of Watermelon Chess where the player performing the capture must completely surround their opponent's piece (or possibly pieces as in the case of Rek) with or without the aid of the edge(s) of the board, and in such a way that the captured piece(s) cannot perform a legal move (hypothetically on the opponent's next turn). The capturing method also resembles that of Wéiqí, Baduk, and Go.

Rek and Min Rek Chanh may be classified as chess variants since the objective is to capture the other player's king.

Since Gala utilizes custodian capture and an n x n square board that is uncheckered, it is therefore related to Mak-yek, Apit-sodok, Rek, and Minh Rek Chanh. But Gala differs greatly in many ways. Firstly, its board is smaller with 7 x 7 squares since the board is thought to be originally used for a race-game according to Murray. Secondly, the number of pieces each player has is different, with the Black player only having 10 pieces and the White player having 13 pieces. Thirdly, the board is empty in the beginning of the game thus requiring a drop phase before a movement phase begins. Moreover, the first move of the game (which is made by Black) is required to be placed on the central square. Lastly, there is no capture by intervention.

The second version of Mak-yek might be a hunt game, but one of the more rare ones that use a square board as in Fox and Hounds, except in Fox and Hounds capture by leap (or any form of capture) is not allowed, but in Mak-yek it is allowed.

== Bibliography ==
- H. J. R. Murray: History of Board Games other than Chess (1952)
