= Catch the hare =

Board game

Catch the hare is a two-player abstract strategy board game from Europe, and perhaps specifically from Spain. It is a hunt game, and since it uses a standard alquerque board from the game alquerque de doze, it is specifically a tiger hunt game (or tiger game). In some variants, some or all of the diagonal lines are missing which makes it difficult to classify as a tiger game in general. One hare is going up against ten to twelve opponents(hunters or hounds). The hare is the "tiger" in this hunt game which is prey and predator at the same time. The hare can capture the opponents by leaping over them (short leap method). The opponents attempt to surround and trap the hare.

The game is the earliest recorded hunt game in Europe, and perhaps even the first hunt game from Europe (other than bear games and hare games). The earliest record of the game is in Alfonso X's "Libro de los juegos" or "Book of Games" in 1283. The record shows a game called cercar la liebre, a game played in Spain from the 13th. century until today. Cercar la liebre means "corner the rabbit", but it was the game historian H.J.R. Murray who (perhaps mistakenly) called it "Catch the Hare". The Moors may have brought the game to Spain since it uses an alquerque board, however, there is no record of the game or any similar game in Arabic literature. Cercar la liebre evolved into many variants around the world including the games of Fox and Geese. The game has spread to Central and North America thanks to the Spanish who brought it with them during their conquest. The game was transformed in name and structure by the American natives. The new names given were pon chochotl or coyote and chickens according to game historians Stewart Culin and David Parlett, and "they were played by the Papago Indians of Arizona and the Tew Tribe of New Mexico who play on the same board as Alfonso’s cercar la liebre", and Indian and jackrabbits which are things found in the Americas. Mexicans play on one version with only two main diagonals, and this is described by Stewart Culin in his book Chess and Playing Cards: Catalogue of Games and Implements for Divination Exhibited by the United States National Museum in Connection with the Department of Archaeology and Paleontology of the University of Pennsylvania at the Cotton States and International Exposition (1895), and calls it coyote, a game from Mexico, with only the main diagonal lines present. In some cases the diagonal lines were completely removed making it difficult to classify with the other tiger games such as bagh-chal, rimau-rimau, and buga-shadara. Other hunt games such as sua ghin gnua and tiger and buffaloes also do not have diagonal lines but may still be classified as tiger games.

Today, cercar la liebre is still popular in Spain under the name juego de la liebre.

== Setup ==
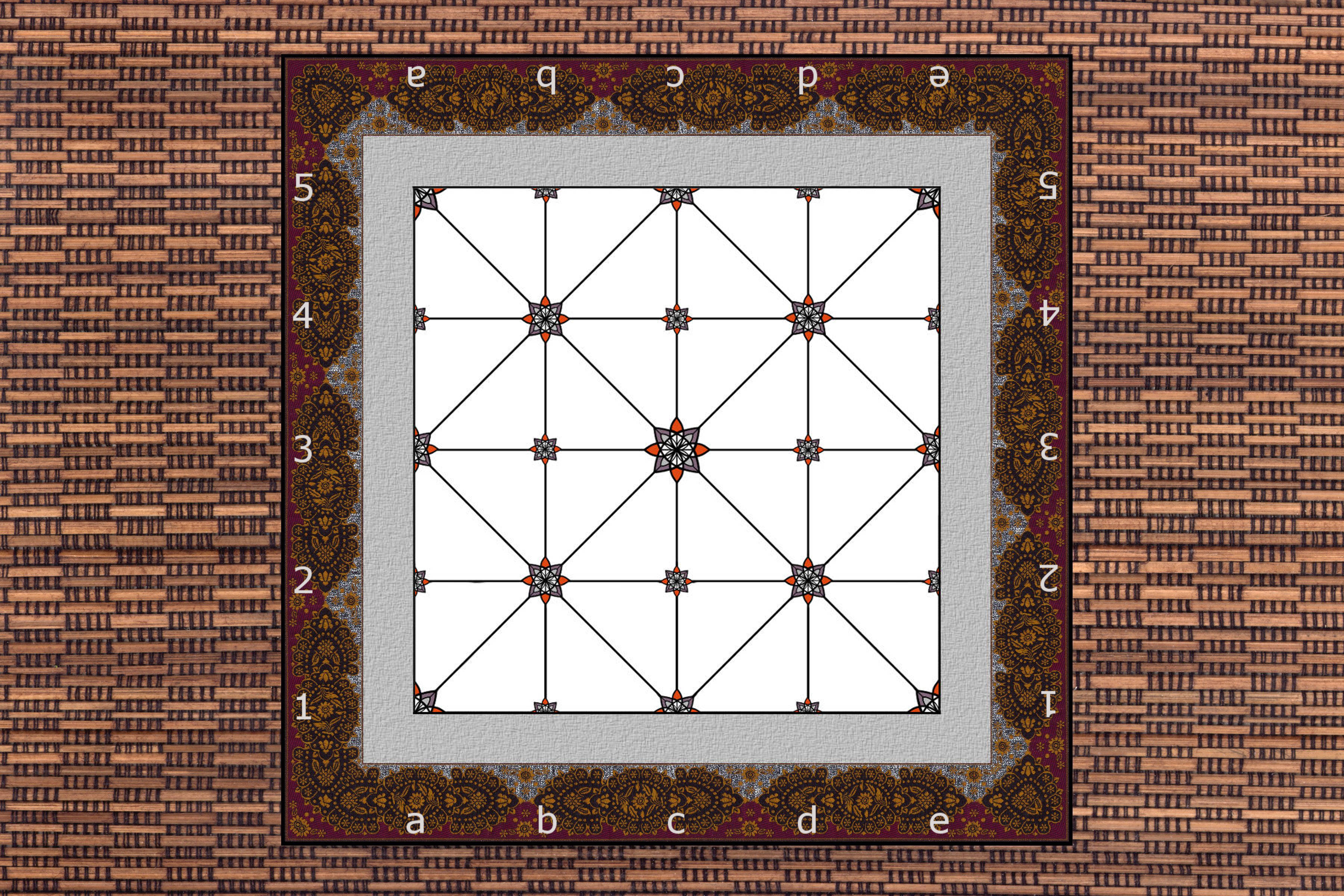
The catch the hare game board is similar to the one used for the game alquerque. The algebraic notation facilitates move annotation and game play discussion.

A game board similar to an alquerque board is used. In one variant, the small diagonals are removed, but the long diagonals that cross the span of the alquerque board remain. In yet another variant, all the diagonals are removed. In all cases, there is one hare which can be represented as a black piece, and ten to twelve hunters or hounds (as agreed upon by the players) represented as white pieces. One player plays the hare, and the other plays the hunters.

Here-in-forth, the white pieces will simply be called the hunters.

== Rules ==
- Players alternate their turns throughout the game.
- Pieces are situated on the intersection points (here-in-forth called "points") of the board, and move and capture along the lines.
- In the beginning, the hare is placed at the central point of the board (at position c3). Ten hunters are place on the first two ranks of one side of the board (row 1 and 2). If twelve hunters are used, the remaining two hunters are placed on the third rank's outermost points (at positions a3 and e3). If eleven hunters are used, it is unknown where the remaining one hunter is placed on the third rank.
- The hunters move first.

In the English Translation of “The Book of Mill”, the hare (or rabbit as written) moves first instead. The Book of Mill is the English translation of "Libro del alquerque" which is the sixth treatise of Alfonso X's "Libro de los juegos" or "Book of Games" (1283), the very book in which catch the hare (cercar la liebre) is first documented.

- Hare and hunters move alike. They move onto a vacant adjacent point along a line. Only one hunter may be moved in a turn.
- A hare may capture a hunter(s), but a hare must either move or capture exclusively in a turn.
- The hare can capture an adjacent hunter by the short leap as in draughts or alquerque. The hare leaps over an adjacent hunter, and lands on a vacant adjacent point behind. The leap must be completed in a straight line and follow the pattern on the board. The hare can continue to leap over more hunters if it is able to. The hare can stop leaping anytime during the turn even when there are more hunters that could be leaped over. Captures are not compulsory. Captured pieces are removed from the board, but in some versions, the captured pieces are not removed immediately (upon being leaped over, and are instead removed at the end of the turn) allowing for the hare to leap over a previously leaped hunter which may allow the hare to capture more hunters or achieve a possibly better position for itself.
- The hunters can not capture.
- The hunters win if they block the hare (i.e. the hare cannot perform a legal move or capture). The hare wins if it captures enough of the hunters such that they can not effectively immobilize the hare (usually when the hunters are reduced to 9 pieces).

== Variants ==
As stated earlier, Mexicans play on a variant of catch the hare with only two main diagonals which is called coyote, and it is described by Stewart Culin. A variant of that Mexican game is found in El Paso, Texas, called el coyote by Ediciones Bob, S.A. [n.d.]. In this variant, the board uses a standard alquerque board, but it is elongated on one side by two ranks (the standard alquerque board is not elongated by one rank on each side, but specifically elongated by two ranks on one side to maintain a specific pattern). Instead of the standard 5 × 5 alquerque board, it is a 5 × 7 board with 35 intersection points. The match is between one coyote and twelve chickens, as opposed to one hare and twelve hunters or hounds in catch the hare. Furthermore, the chickens can only move straight forward, diagonally forward, and sideways, whereas the hunters or hounds can move in any direction. The twelve chickens are initially placed on the outermost intersection points of the fifth rank from the top, and occupying all the intersection points of the sixth and seventh rank.

In yet another American variant, there was no piece to represent the hare on the board, and the hare's position on the board was merely pointed at with a stick which is a playing technique found in a few other games.

== Related games ==
- Adugo
- Buga-shadara
- Bagh bandi
- Bagh-chal
- Fox games
- Komikan
- Main tapal empat
- Rimau
- Rimau-rimau
- Sher-bakar
