= Tiger and buffaloes =

Abstract strategy board game from Myanmar

Tiger and buffaloes is a two-player abstract strategy board game from Myanmar (formerly known as Burma). It belongs to the hunt game family. The board is a 4x4 square grid, where pieces are placed on the intersection points and move along the lines. It is one of the smallest hunt games. Three tigers are going up against eleven buffaloes. The tigers attempt to capture as many of the buffaloes by the short leap as in draughts or alquerque. The buffaloes attempt to hem in the tigers.

The game most resembles tiger hunt games (or tiger games) and perhaps can be classified as one. Examples of tiger games are bagh-chal, rimau-rimau, and catch the hare. Tiger games usually consist of a standard Alquerque board which is a 5 x 5 square grid with several diagonal lines. Tiger and buffaloes consist of only a 4 x 4 square grid with no diagonal lines. It therefore most resembles hunt games such as khla si ko, len cúa kín ngoa, and sua ghin gnua.

The game was described by Miloš Zapletal in his 1986 book Velká encyklopedie her; II. Hry v klubovně which when translated from Czech is Great Encyclopedia of games; II. Games in the clubhouse.

Another name for the game is tiger game.

== Setup ==
A 4x4 square grid is used, and this creates 16 intersection points (here-in-forth referred to as "points"). There are 3 tiger pieces and 11 buffalo pieces with each set of pieces distinguishable from the other by color or design. Players decide who will play the Tigers, and who will play the Buffaloes. The board is empty in the beginning with each player's pieces set beside it.

== Rules ==
- Players alternate their turns throughout the game.
- The first stage of the game is the drop phase. The buffaloes move first. Four buffaloes are placed on any vacant points on the board. Then the tiger player places one tiger on any vacant point. Then the buffalo player places four more of its pieces on any vacant points. Then the tiger player places another tiger piece onto any vacant point. Then the buffalo player places its last three buffaloes on any vacant point. Lastly, the tiger player places its last tiger onto any vacant point.
- The next stage is the movement phase. The buffaloes move first. Both tigers and buffaloes can move along a line onto a vacant adjacent point. There are only orthogonal lines on the board, and therefore all moves are orthogonal (right, left, forward, backward). However, the tiger instead can capture an adjacent buffalo. The tiger leaps over the adjacent buffalo, and lands on a vacant point immediately beyond. The leap must be in a straight line, and follow the pattern on the board. The captured buffalo is removed from the board. It is uncertain if multiple leaps and captures are allowed. It is also uncertain if captures are compulsory, but in all other hunt games, captures are never compulsory.
- The tigers win if they capture enough buffaloes such that the buffaloes can no longer effectively block their movements.
- The buffaloes win if they block the movements of the tigers (i.e., the tigers cannot perform a legal move or capture).

== Khla si ko ==
a4 white circle	b4	c4	d4 white circle
a3	b3	c3	d3
a2	b2	c2	d2
a1 white circle	b1	c1	d1 white circle

Starting positions of khla si ko with the four tigers located on the four corner squares represented as white circular pieces. It is exactly the same as in len cúa kín ngoa.

Khla si ko is a Cambodian variant of Myanmar's tiger and buffaloes and of Thailand's len cúa kín ngoa. Khla si ko when translated from Khmer to English means tigers and cows, or tigers and bulls. The game is also sometimes spelled as kla si ko or khlaa syi kau. Khlaa syi kau may also mean tiger eats cow. The game also uses a 4 x 4 board as in Tiger and buffaloes, but Tiger and buffaloes uses a 4 x 4 square grid where pieces are played on the gridded lines and intersection points. Khla si ko uses a 4 x 4 square board where the pieces are played within the squares. There are also 4 tigers and 12 cows in Khla si ko which is a contrast to the 3 tigers and 11 buffaloes of Tiger and buffaloes. There are a few other differences also. But both Khla si ko and Tiger and buffaloes have only orthogonal movement of pieces, and only move one space at a time. Tigers in both games capture by the short leap as in draughts and Alquerque, and only in orthogonal directions. Diagonal movements or captures are not allowed in both games. A game called Dragons and Swans is played exactly the same way with the same board and number of pieces.

Khla si ko is a hunt game, and may be considered a tiger hunt game, or in short tiger game, since one side is represented by tigers. Usually tiger games consist of an Alquerque board which is a 5 x 5 square grid with several diagonal lines, and pieces are played on the intersection points and move along the lines. These features are missing in Khla si ko.

=== Setup ===
The board is a 4 x 4 square consisting of 16 squares. There are 4 tiger pieces and 12 cow pieces with each set of pieces distinguishable from the other by color or design. Players decide which animal to play. The game begins with the 4 tigers situated on the four corner squares of the board with the rest of the board empty. The 12 cows are set beside the board awaiting to be placed on the board.

=== Rules ===
- Players alternate their turns throughout the game.
- Cows have the first turn, and one cow may be place onto any vacant square on the board. All 12 cows will be entered on the board one cow in a turn before any of them can be moved on the board.
- The tigers on their turn may move orthogonally (up, down, right, or left) to a vacant adjacent square. Alternatively, a tiger may capture a cow if one is available for capture. The tiger must leap (in a straight line) over an orthogonally adjacent cow, and land on an empty square immediately beyond. The leapt cow is captured, and removed from the board. A tiger may only move or capture exclusively in a turn, it cannot do both, and only one tiger may be used in a turn. Multiple captures in a turn are not allowed.
- As with the tigers, cows move only orthogonally one space onto a vacant adjacent square. However, cows are not allowed to capture or leap over any tigers or fellow cows. Only one cow may be moved in a turn.
- Tigers are not allowed to leap over or capture fellow tigers.
- If the tigers eat all the cows, the tigers wins. If the tigers block the movements of the cows preventing the cows from moving, then this is also deemed a win for the tigers.
- If the cows block the movements of the 4 tigers, then the cows win.

== Len cúa kín ngoa ==
a4 white circle	b4	c4	d4 white circle
a3	b3	c3	d3
a2	b2	c2	d2
a1 white circle	b1	c1	d1 white circle

Starting positions of len cúa kín ngoa with the four tigers located on the four corner squares represented as white circular pieces. It is exactly the same as in khla si ko.

Len cúa kín ngoa or the game of "tigers eating cattle" is a game from Thailand (formerly Siam). It was observed and documented by Captain James Low in Asiatic Researches (1839). The game resembles Khla si ko and Tiger and Buffaloes in that it is a hunt game that uses a 4 x 4 board. It especially resembles Khla si ko in that the 4 x 4 board is specifically a 4 x 4 square board where game pieces are placed within the squares; moreover, there are 4 tigers versus 12 oxen, and that the opening setup has the tigers on the four corners squares of the board. There are however some features that make this game possibly unique which will be described in the Rules section. The following setup and rules are based upon Low's description, however many parts of his description were vague.

=== Setup ===
The board is a 4 x 4 square consisting of 16 squares. There are 4 tiger pieces and 12 oxen pieces with each set of pieces distinguishable from the other by color or design. Players decide which animal to play. The game begins with the 4 tigers situated on the four corner squares of the board with the rest of the board empty. The 12 oxen are set beside the board awaiting to be placed on the board.

=== Rules ===
- Players alternate their turns throughout the game.
- Oxen have the first turn, and one ox may be place onto any vacant square on the board. Captain James Low does not describe how the remaining 11 oxen are specifically entered on the board, but it might be assumed that all 12 oxen are entered on the board one ox per turn as in Khla si ko especially since only one ox was placed on the first turn suggesting that oxen are entered one per turn. In most hunt games only one piece may be dropped or moved in a turn. Low also does not describe when the oxen can move, but in Khla si ko, an ox may only move on the board after all 12 of them have been dropped.
- The nearest tiger to the first oxen dropped on the board is the first tiger to move, but Low does not describe how tigers can move, that is, whether or not they can move orthogonally or diagonally, and whether their movements are limited to an adjacent vacant square, or if they can move any number of unoccupied squares.
- Low describes that a tiger may capture an ox by the short leap if the ox is orthogonally adjacent to the tiger, and there is an empty square immediately beyond. Low explicitly rules out diagonal captures.
- Low does not describe if oxen move only orthogonally or diagonally, or whether they are limited to moving only to an adjacent vacant square, or whether they can move any number of unoccupied squares. Low does not rule out whether or not oxen can capture using the short leap, but since he doesn't describe it, it is unlikely. In most hunt games, the side with the greater number of pieces usually can not capture by the short leap.
- Low does describe that the tigers can be captured if they are hemmed in by the oxen. He writes "The tigers are taken and put off the board when hemmed in so that they cannot move, or they are taken then by the oxen moving (only then) diagonally. If only two tigers are left on the board the oxen are victors." This statement suggest that each tiger (or group of tigers) when hemmed in by the oxen is captured and removed from the board, thus allowing the tigers to be reduced to two (or less) delivering the victory for the oxen. Hemming in a single tiger or a group of tigers and capturing them is a form of custodian capture that's found in other games but is highly uncommon in hunt games. (Note: Len cúa kín ngoa's custodian capture method resembles that of rek and watermelon chess.) The phrase that tigers "are taken then by the oxen moving (only then) diagonally" is vague. If we assume that the oxen can only move orthogonally as in Khla si ko, then it appears strange or contradictory that they can move diagonally only when attempting to capture the tigers. But if that is not Low's intent, then perhaps he is suggesting that the oxen can only move diagonally and not orthogonally, and it's only now that he's taking the time to describe the exclusive diagonal movements of the oxen. Another possibility is that the oxen may move orthogonally or diagonally, but only hem in and capture the tigers when moving diagonally.

== Related games ==
- Adugo
- Bagh-chal
- Buga-shadara
- Catch the hare
- Komikan
- Main tapal empat
- Rimau
- Rimau-rimau
- Sua ghin gnua
