= Hare games =

Two-player board games

A starting position for a game of hare and hounds

Hare games are two-player abstract strategy board games that were popular in medieval northern Europe up until the 19th century. In this game, a hare is trying to get past three dogs who are trying to surround it and trap it. The three dogs are represented by three pieces which normally start on one end of the board, and the hare is represented by one piece that usually starts in the middle of the board or is dropped on any vacant point in the beginning of the game.

Hare games are similar to Bear games and hunt games. One side has more pieces than the other with the larger side attempting to hem in the smaller side. The smaller side though is usually compensated with more powers. Where hare games differ is that the hounds can only move forward or sideways, and not backwards. The hunters in the Bear games can move in all directions. Furthermore, the dog in the hare games cannot capture any of the hares, unlike the tigers, leopards, jaguars, and foxes in the hunt games which can capture their respective prey counterparts.

There are several different hare game boards depending upon the country of origin. Many preferred the narrow double-ended spearhead-like boards with orthogonal and diagonal lines running through them. There were several variations on this design. However, one in Denmark used a round board, and another design is found in Latvia.

Hare games are referred to by different names. In 19th century France, a hare game that was popular among the military was called Le jeu militaire (French military game). The dog is sometimes referred to as a hound, and hence the alternative title to this game as hare and hounds. Other names are French military game, game of dwarfs, the devil among tailors, and trevolpa or volpalejden.

As the rules of the game are simple to program, there are many electronic implementations of the game. The second link below allows you to play this game. In this computer game, the hares and hounds are reversed. Instead, it is the hounds attempting to surround and immobilize the hare.

== Goal ==
The three hounds attempt to surround and immobilize the hare.

The hare attempts to pass the hounds, and/or reach the other end of the board.

== Equipment ==
There are a variety of hare game boards. The more common one is a two-ended spearhead-like board with orthogonal and diagonal lines running through it.

Three pieces representing the hounds are of one color, and one piece representing the hare is of another color.

== Gameplay and rules ==
1. Players decide which animal to play. Depending on the versions, the hounds will usually be placed on one end of the board while the hare will be placed in the middle of the board or dropped onto any vacant point on the board in the first move.
2. It is unknown exactly which animal traditionally starts first, and it may actually depend on which hare game version is played, or perhaps there was no traditional first player, and it was up to the players themselves to decide who goes first. Players alternate their turns.
3. Hounds can only move straight forward, diagonally forward, or sideways. They cannot move backwards in any way. They can only move one space per turn onto a vacant point, and follow the pattern on the board. Only one hound can be moved per turn. There are no captures in this game by either the hounds or the hare.
4. The hare can move one space in any direction onto a vacant point following the pattern on the board.
5. If the hare successfully passes the three hounds or reaches the other end of the board, the hare wins. If the hounds surround and immobilize the hare, the hounds win.

== Variants ==
=== Hare and Hounds ===
- One player represents the three hounds, which try to corner the other player's hare as it seeks to win by escaping them.
- The hounds move first. Each player can move one piece one step in each turn. The hounds can only move forward or diagonally (left to right) or vertically (up and down). The hare can move in any direction.
- The hounds win if they "trap" the hare so that it can no longer move.
- The hare wins if it "escapes" (gets past all the hounds by moving to the side of the hound[s] furthest back).
- If the hounds move side-to-side (i.e. vertically) ten times in a row, they are considered to be "stalling", and the hare wins.

== Analysis and modern implementations ==
Hare and hounds is a classic example of the type of game studied in combinatorial game theory, giving it some similarities to checkers (draughts), Go, Fox and Geese and other such games. Mathematician Martin Gardner in his October 1963 Mathematical Games column in Scientific American stated that hare and hounds "combines extreme simplicity with extraordinary strategic subtlety".

Frederik Schuh analyses three variants of the game in The Master Book of Mathematical Recreations with different boards, using the name "The Soldiers' Game" for the one displayed on this page. He demonstrates that white (the hounds) wins given perfect play, regardless of the starting position of black (the hare).

For hare and hounds in variants, with perfect play, the game is a win for the hounds without changing starting position that the hare escapes trivially.

== Related games ==
Bear games, and hunt games such as rimau, rimau-rimau, adugo, kaooa, main tapal empat, bagha-chall, aadu puli attam, and the game called watermelon chess
