= Tiger game =

Chinese board game

The playing board of the tiger game

The tiger game (老虎棋) is a traditional Chinese board game. It is a strategy game for two players. One player, who plays the tiger, has only one piece. The other player has 18 men. The tiger must eat the men, who must block the tiger so that he cannot move. The game can be played with any kind of pieces that can be distinguished from one another. The board is 8×8 squares, with the addition of a square of 2×2 squares, which is called the tiger's lair.

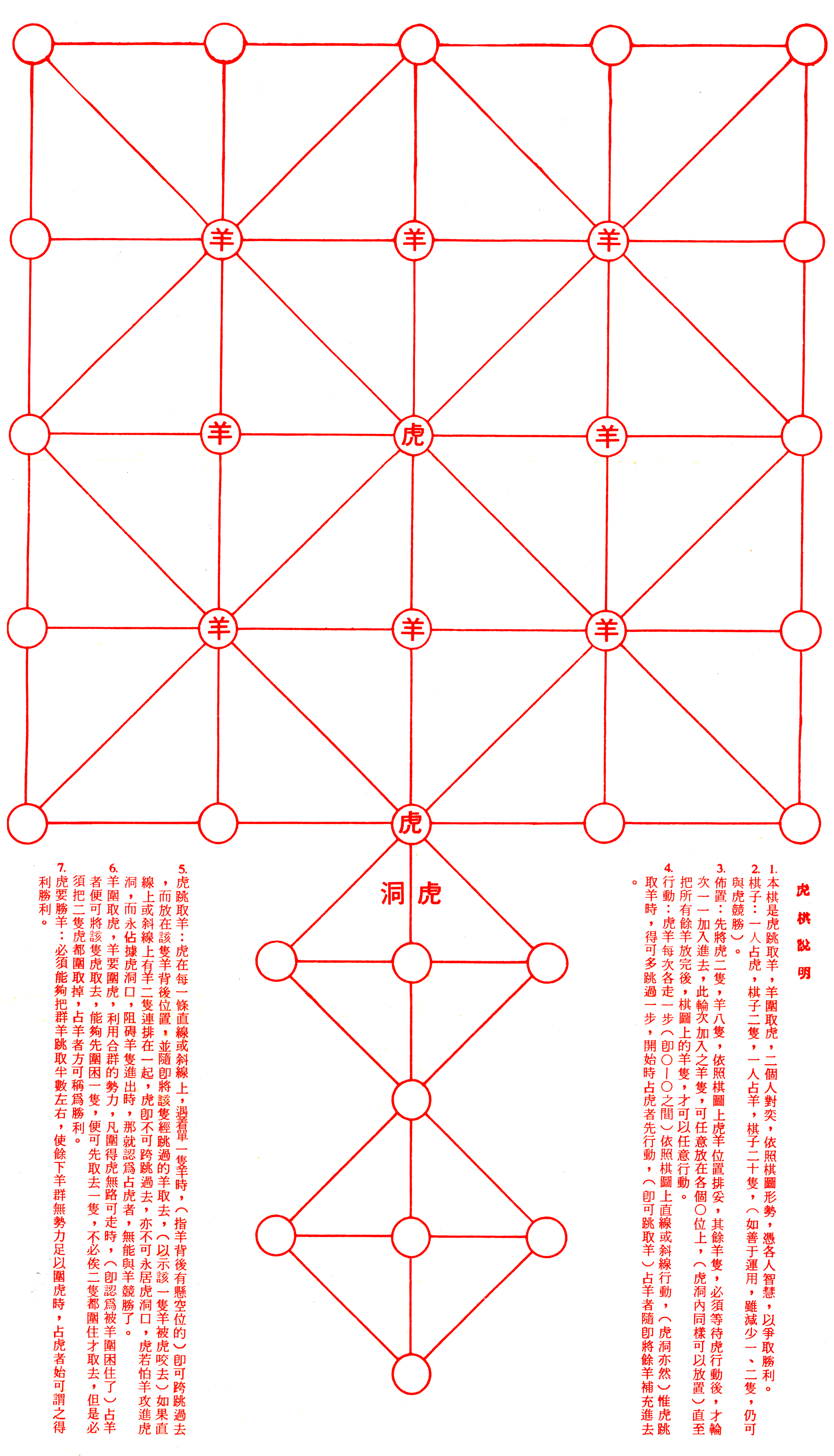
Another kind of the tiger game in Taiwan

== Play ==
The men cannot take the tiger, but can only block him. The tiger, by jumping over a man, can take it, in which case the man is removed from play. The men must stay together 2 by 2 to block the tiger. In general, if a tiger eats more than three pieces, it is unlikely that men will have enough pieces to win the game. If the men do not make mistakes, but move cautiously, victory is likely.

== Related games ==
- Two Tigers Chess
- Three Tigers Chess

== See also ==
- Tiger and buffaloes
- Fox games
- Leopard hunt game
- Main tapal empat
- Rimau
- Aadu puli attam
- Bagh-chal
- Deer games
- Tibet tiger games
