= Sua ghin gnua =

Board for sua ghin gnua

Sua ghin gnua is a two-player abstract strategy board game from Thailand, formerly known as Siam. Another name for the game is tigers and oxen. It is a hunt game played on a 5x5 square grid with only orthogonal lines. One player plays the three tigers, and the other player plays the twelve oxen. The board is empty in the beginning. Players first drop their pieces onto the board, and then are able to move them. The tigers can capture the oxen by the short leap as in draughts and alquerque, but the oxen attempt to elude and at the same time hem in the tiger.

== Influences ==
Sua Ghin Gnua most resembles the tiger hunt games (or tiger games) such as bagh-chal, rimau-rimau, main tapal empat, catch the hare, and adugo since they all use a 5 × 5 square grid. But tiger games technically consist of a standard alquerque board which is a 5 × 5 square grid with several diagonal lines criss-crossing through it which are completely missing in sua ghin gnua. There are however some variants of catch the hare which have missing diagonal lines also.

Another game that resembles sua ghin gnua is from Myanmar, called tiger and buffaloes, which is a hunt game consisting of a 4 × 4 square grid with no diagonal lines. Myanmar happens to border Thailand geographically so there might be a historical connection between the two games. Another game from Myanmar is lay gwet kyah that is presumed to be similar to sua ghin gnua.

Sua ghin gnua was briefly described by Stewart Culin (1898), H.J.R. Murray (1913), and R.C. Bell (1969).

== Gameplay ==
=== Setup ===
A square grid is used, consisting of 5×5 (twenty-five) intersection points (here-in-forth referred to as "points"). The square grid consists only of orthogonal lines, that is, there are no diagonal lines. It is not an Alquerque board. There are three tiger pieces that are black, and twelve oxen pieces that are white.

Players decide who will play the tiger, and who will play the oxen.

The board is empty in the beginning with each player's pieces set beside the board.

=== Rules ===
- Players alternate their turns.
- Players first drop their pieces onto the board. Stewart Culin, H.J.R. Murray, and R.C. Bell unfortunately did not describe in detail how they are dropped onto the board. In some other hunt games, an oxen piece would first be dropped onto any vacant point on the board followed by a tiger piece onto any vacant point on the board, and players would continue in this fashion. Tiger pieces may not be moved or perform captures until all three tigers have been dropped onto the board which takes three turns. Likewise, oxen pieces may not be moved until all twelve oxen pieces have been dropped onto the board which takes twelve turns. Another method that could be employed is the one used in the Myanmar game of Tiger and Buffaloes. Four oxen pieces would be dropped first, followed by a tiger piece. Then four more oxen pieces would be dropped, followed by another tiger piece. Then the remaining four oxen pieces would be dropped, followed by the last tiger piece.
- Both tigers and oxen move (in any direction) along a line onto a vacant adjacent point on the board. All lines are orthogonal, therefore, all movements are left, right, forward, and backwards.
- Only one oxen may be moved in a turn. Oxen cannot perform a capture.
- Only one tiger may be moved or perform a capture exclusively in a turn.
- A tiger piece performs a capture by leaping over an adjacent oxen as in the short leap in draughts. The leap must be along an orthogonal line, and the tiger must land on a vacant point on the board immediately beyond the oxen. The leaped oxen is removed from the board. Stewart Culin, H.J.R. Murray, and R.C. Bell do not mention if multiple leaps and captures are allowed, or if captures are compulsory, but in general captures are not compulsory in hunt games.
- The three tigers win if they capture enough oxen pieces so that the oxen cannot effectively block their movements. The oxen win if they block the movements of all three tigers.

== Related games ==
- Adugo
- Bagh-chal
- Buga-shadara
- Catch the hare
- Komikan
- Main tapal empat
- Rimau
- Rimau-rimau
- Tiger and buffaloes
