= Sher-bakar =

Board game from Punjab, India

Sher-bakar is a two-player abstract strategy board game from Punjab, India. It is a hunt game. It uses an alquerque board, and therefore, sher-bakar is specifically a tiger hunt game (or tiger game). There are two tigers attempting to elude and capture as many of the other player's pieces which in other hunt games in this part of the world is often referred to as a goat, cows, lamb, or men. An interesting and uncommon feature in this game is that the goats, cows, lamb, or men are piled up on four points of the board at the beginning of the game. Piling up pieces is an unusual feature in hunt games or any board game in general. The only other hunt game that uses this feature is Bagh bandi, a game closely related to sher-bakar. Hereinafter, the white pieces will be referred to as goats.

== Goal ==
The goats win if they surround and immobilize the two tigers.

The tigers win if they capture enough goats so that they cannot immobilize the tigers.

== Equipment ==
The board is an alquerque board. There are 2 tigers represented as black pieces, and 19 goats represented as white pieces.

== Game play and rules ==
1. Players decide which animal to play.

2. In the beginning, one tiger is placed on the middle point of the left most column, and the other tiger is placed on the middle point of the right most column. The goats are placed on four different points. They are placed on the second and fourth point of the second left most column, and on the second and fourth point of the middle column. Three of the four points have five goats piled up, and the remaining point has four goats piled up.

3. Players alternate their turns throughout the game. Only one piece may be used to move or capture per turn. The goats start first.

4. There is no source that completely describes the movement of the goats or tigers for sher-bakar. However, a similar game called Bagh bandi that is from Lower Bengal, India may provide us the answer. The goat player may take the top goat of a pile, and place it onto any vacant adjacent point following the pattern on the board. Or the goat player can take any single goat on the board and move it one space onto any vacant adjacent point following the pattern on the board. A goat may not move onto a pile, or onto a single goat piece to form a pile.

Similarly, a tiger may be moved one space onto a vacant adjacent point following the pattern on the board.

5. A tiger can capture by the short leap as in draughts or alquerque. The tiger leaps over the adjacent goat, and lands on a vacant point immediately beyond. The leap must be in a straight line and follow the pattern on the board. A tiger can also leap over a pile of goats, but only captures the top most goat of the pile, and lands onto a vacant point on the other side. Again, the jump must be in a straight line and follow the pattern on the board. Only one capture is allowed per turn, however, another source states that multiple captures are allowed. If multiple captures are allowed, the tiger, however, cannot jump back and forth on the same pile to capture all of its pieces in one turn. Captures are not compulsory.

Goats cannot capture.

== Related games ==
- Bagh bandi
- Main tapal empat
- Aadu puli attam
- Bagha-chall
- Rimau
- Rimau-rimau
- Adugo
- Komikan
- Buga-shadara
- Kungser
- 二十四子抓王倫
