= Kaooa =

Kaooa is a two-player abstract strategy game first recorded in the central provinces of India. It is a hunt game like rimau, rimau-rimau, main tapal empat, bagha-chall, the fox games, and aadu puli attam. However, what makes kaooa unique is that the board is a five-pointed star or a pentagram. Kaooa is also known as vultures and crows. One vulture goes up against seven crows.

== Goal ==
The goal of the crows is to block the movements of the vultures.

The goal of the vulture is to capture four crows which is enough to prevent the crows from ever blocking its movements.

== Equipment ==
A five-pointed star or pentagram is used which makes for ten points or spaces on the board that pieces can be dropped and moved upon. There is one vulture piece, and seven crow pieces. The vulture and crows must be of different color or distinguishable objects.

== Rules and game play ==
1. Players decide who will play the vulture, and who will play the crows.

2. The board is empty in the beginning. All pieces are set beside the board.

3. Players alternate their turns throughout the game.

4. Drop phase: Crows start first, and one crow is dropped anywhere on the board. Crows continue to drop one piece per turn on any vacant point until all seven crows have been dropped which requires seven turns. Afterwards, the crows can begin to move.

After the first crow is dropped, the vulture is dropped by the other player on any vacant point on the board. On the vulture's next turn, it can move and capture crows.

5. Move phase: After all seven crows have been dropped, the crows can move one space onto a vacant point per turn following the pattern on the board. Crows cannot capture.

Vultures can either move one space onto a vacant point per turn following the pattern on the board, or capture one crow per turn. Capture is the same as in Draughts, where a vulture can jump over an adjacent crow piece and land on a vacant point on the other side. The jump must follow the pattern of the board, and be in a straight line. Multiple captures are not allowed.

== Variant ==
HJR Murray also documents a game referred to as Kaooa which is played on a pentagram. Play is as described above with the exception of a single "tiger" piece hunting 7 kaooa

== Related games ==
- Rimau
- Rimau-rimau
- Main tapal empat
- Adugo
- Bagha-chall
- Aadu puli attam
- Fox games
