= Meurimueng-rimueng-do =

Game board for meurimueng-rimueng-do, shared with other leopard hunt games

Meurimueng-rimueng-do is a two-player abstract strategy board game from Sumatra, Indonesia. It is played by the Acehnese. The game was published in the book entitled "The Achehnese" by Hurgronje, O'Sullivan, and Wilkinson in 1906 and described on page 204. The game is a hunt game similar to Pulijudam and Demala diviyan keliya. They use the same triangular board. Therefore, meurimueng-rimueng-do is specifically a leopard hunt game (or leopard game). In this game, 5 leopards are going up against 15 sheep. The sheep attempt to surround and trap the 5 leopards while the leopards attempt to avoid this fate by capturing enough of the sheep.

Meurimueng-rimueng-do should not be confused with another Sumatran game with a very similar name, meurimueng-rimueng peuet ploh as they are unrelated. The former is a leopard game, whereas the latter is related to Alquerque. Both games, however, are played by the Acehnese.

While Meurimueng-rimueng-do is usually described as a leopard game, the leopards are sometimes known as tigers instead.

== Setup ==
The board is a triangular pattern with a rectangular cross-section forming 23 intersection points. It is the same board used for the games Pulijudam and Demala diviyan keliya.

There are 5 leopard pieces and 15 sheep pieces. The leopard and sheep pieces should be distinguishable from each other by color or shape or design.

Players decide what animal to play (leopard or sheep).

The board is empty in the beginning with each player's pieces set next to the board.

== Rules ==
- Players drop their own pieces onto any available intersection point, one piece per turn. Players alternate their turns. This will require the Sheep 15 turns, but it will only require the Leopard 5 turns. Therefore, the Leopard can begin to move and capture even before all the sheep pieces have been dropped. It is uncertain which animal starts the game first, however, players can decide among themselves whom should start first.
- A sheep moves along a marked line to a vacant adjacent point in a turn. Only one sheep may be moved per turn.
- A leopard moves along a marked line to a vacant adjacent point in a turn, or performs a capture of a sheep using the short leap method as in draughts. Only one leopard may be moved or used for capture in a turn. Only the leopards can perform a capture.
- A leopard captures an adjacent sheep by leaping over it in a straight line, and landing onto a vacant point immediately beyond following the pattern on the board (short leap method). The captured sheep is removed from the board. Only one sheep may be captured per turn. Captures are not compulsory.
- The sheep win if they prevent the leopards from performing a legal move or capture.
- The leopards win if they capture enough sheep making it impossible for the sheep to ever accomplish their objective.

== Related Games ==
- Pulijudam
- Demala diviyan keliya
- Len Choa
- Hat diviyan keliya
