= Gonu =

Korean traditional board games

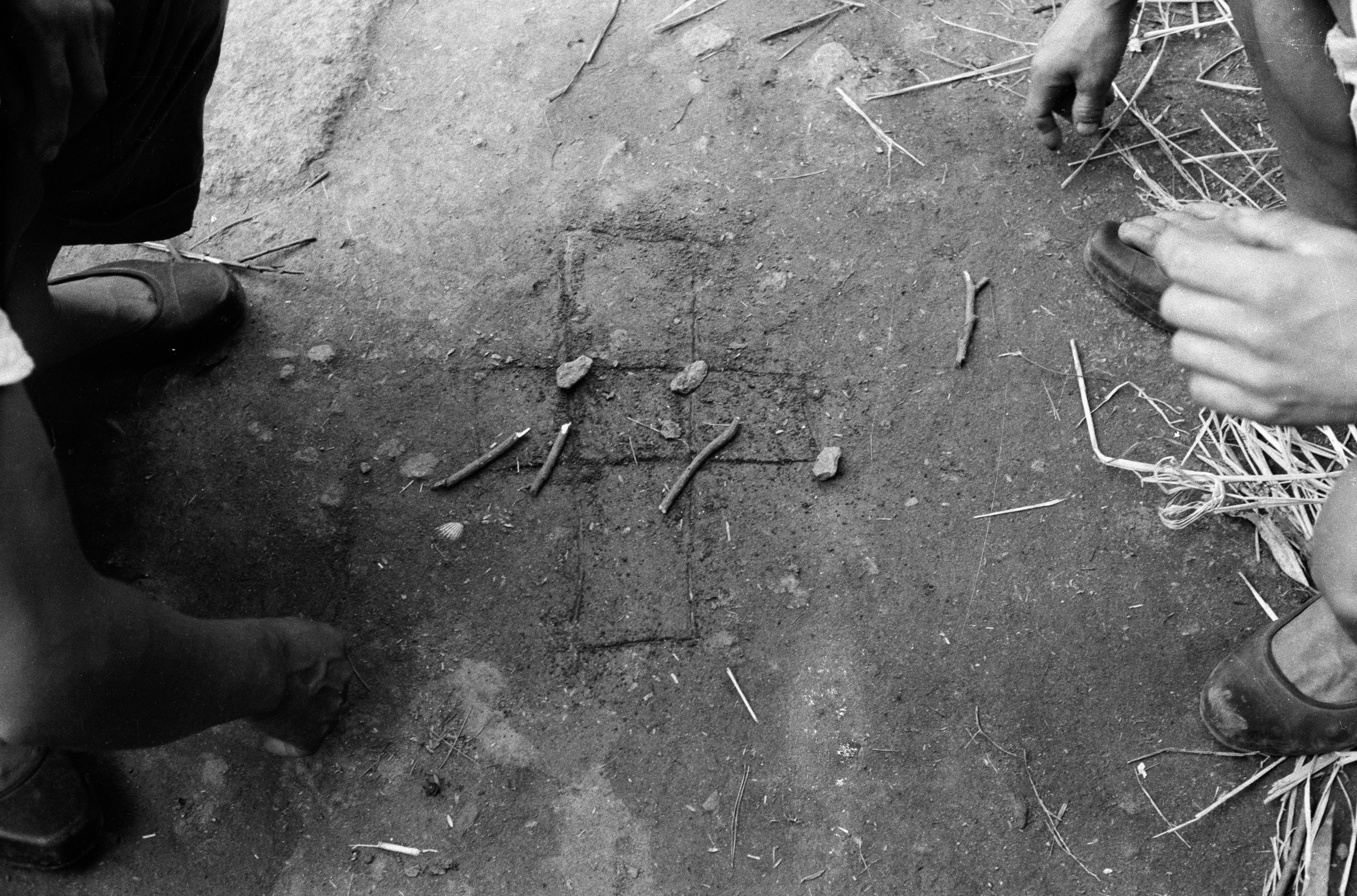
Photograph of Gonu gameplay

Gonu (Korean: 고누) or kono refers to a group of Korean traditional boardgames which are played by two players on diagrams, each taking turns to move their pieces, with the general objective to block or capture the other player's pieces. Although Gonu games are played in a manner similar to asymmetric hunt games like Fox, Leopard, and Tiger, each Gonu player starts with an equal number of pieces instead.

When playing kono, a person who has a lower number starts, like janggi. The usual way of playing is to surround and detach the opponent's pieces. It is mainly used for children's educational purposes.

== Examples ==
Five-field kono
(오밭고누)

Four-field kono
(네밭고누)

Gonjilgonu
(참고누)

Umul gonu
(우물고누)
