= Demala diviyan keliya =

Board game

Game board for demala diviyan keliya, a leopard hunt game

Demala diviyan keliya or Koti Sellama is a two-player abstract strategy board game from Sri Lanka, formerly known as Ceylon. It is a hunt game, and since it uses a triangle board, Demala diviyan keliya is specifically a leopard hunt game (or leopard game). Three leopards are going up against fifteen dogs. The dogs attempt to surround and trap the leopards while the leopards attempt to capture enough of them in order to foil their objective. It is unknown how old the game is, but the game was described by H. Parker in his 1909 book Ancient Ceylon: An Account of the Aborigines and of Part of the Early Civilisation. The game is also known as the Tamil leopards' game. The game is well known in Southern India, and its Hindustani name is Rafāya.

== Setup ==
The board consist of an isosceles triangle where two additional line segments run from the apex of the triangle down to its base thus dividing the triangle into four triangular compartments. In addition, a rectangle intersects the triangle breadth-wise. The rectangle itself is divided into two rectangles as a line segment runs across its breadth. This makes a board with 21 intersection points (henceforth called "points"). There are fifteen dog pieces and three leopard pieces. The dog pieces should be distinguishable from the leopard pieces.

Players decide who will play the Leopards and who will play the Dogs.

Henry Parker does not describe if the board is empty in the beginning or if the three leopard pieces are entered one piece at a time or if all three are already placed on the board and exactly how and where they are placed. Parker only states that the game is played in the same way as in Hat diviyan keliya which is also a leopard game played in Sri Lanka but with less pieces and points on the board. (Note: In Hat Diviyan Keliya, the single tiger piece is comparable to the three leopard pieces in Demala diviyan keliya as they are the side that can perform captures, and the single tiger piece is placed on the apex of the triangle board.) The fifteen dog pieces are set beside the board.

== Rules ==
- Players alternate their turns throughout the game.
- The Dogs on its turn may drop one of its pieces onto any vacant point on the board, and only one in a turn. All fifteen dog pieces must be dropped first before any of them may be moved.
- Assuming all three leopard pieces are already on the board, the Leopards on its turn may either move one of its pieces onto a vacant adjacent point following the pattern on the board, or capture a dog piece by the short leap. In capturing a dog by the short leap, the leopard must be adjacent to the dog, and leap over it (in a straight line and following the pattern of the board) landing on a vacant point immediately beyond. (Note: Henry Parker writes "Capturing the Dogs is termed 'chopping' them (v. kotanawā)") The captured dog piece is removed from the board. Only one capture is allowed in a turn. Captures are not compulsory.
- After all the dog pieces have been dropped, the Dogs may move one of its pieces onto a vacant point following the pattern on the board. Unlike the Leopards, the Dogs cannot perform a capture.
- The Dogs win if they surround and trap the three leopards. That is, the Leopards cannot move or capture on their turn. The Leopards win if they capture enough dogs making it impossible for them to be trapped.

== Related games ==
- Pulijudam
- Len Choa
- Hat diviyan keliya
