= Awithlaknannai Mosona =

Awithlaknannai Mosona is a two-player strategy board game from the Zuni Native American Indian tribe of New Mexico, United States. It is unknown how old the game is. The game was described by Stewart Culin in his book "Games of the North American Indians Volume 2: Games of Skill" (1907). In this book, it was named Awithlaknan Mosona. Awithlaknannai Mosona resembles another Zuni board game called Kolowis Awithlaknannai (fighting serpents) with few minor differences. The former having a smaller board, and depending upon the variant, it also has less lines joining the intersection points. The rules are the same. Awithlaknannai Mosona belongs to the draughts and alquerque family of games as pieces hop over one another when capturing. It is actually more related to Alquerque, since the board is made up of intersection points and lines connecting them. It is thought that the Spanish had brought Alquerque to the American Southwest, and Awithlaknannai Mosona may have been an evolution from Alquerque. However, in Stewart Culin's 1907 book, the Zunis claim that they had adopted a hunt game from Mexico similar to catch the hare and the fox games of Europe, and transformed it into Awithlaknannai Mosona. In these games, one player has more pieces over the other, however, the other player's piece has more powers. The Zuni's equalized the numbers of pieces and their powers, and also may have transformed the board making its length far exceed its width. Diagonal lines also replaced orthogonal lines altogether. However, the hunt game from Mexico may have used an alquerque board even though the game mechanics of their new game, Awithlaknannai Mosona, were completely different.

The complete rules to the game were never fully described by Stewart Culin (as a note all rules from other sources may have been based on Stewart Culin's description), in particular, whether captures are compulsory, and whether multiple captures are allowed. However, Culin's book does state that on the first player's first turn, a piece is moved to the central point of the board (middle intersection point of the middle row), and is jumped by the second player's piece. The second player could have made another move instead of that capture which suggest that capturing is compulsory.

== Goal ==
The person who captures all of their opponent's pieces is the winner. If no more captures can be done by either player, then the game is a draw, or alternatively, the player with the most pieces left on the board is the winner.

== Equipment ==
There are two versions of the board perhaps due to the lack of clarity in Stewart Culin's diagram. The rules to both versions are the same. Both versions contain 25 intersection points. The middle row has 9 intersection points, and the two outer rows has 8 intersection points each. One version has lines missing between the intersection points of the outer rows. The other version has them.

Each player has 12 pieces. One player has the black pieces, and the other player has the white pieces.

== Rules and gameplay ==
1. Players decide who will play the black pieces, and who will play the white pieces. They also decide who will start first.

2. Each players pieces are placed on the row nearest them, and on the right side of the middle row from the view of each player. Only the central point of the board is vacant at the start of the game. Throughout the game, pieces are played on the intersection points and moved along the lines connecting them. From here on, the intersection points will simply be called "points".

3. Players alternate their turns.

4. On a player's turn, one piece may be moved along a marked line onto a vacant adjacent point on the board. The first player's first move is to move a piece onto the central point since that is the only vacant point on the board at the beginning of the game.

5. Alternatively, a piece may leap over an adjacent enemy piece, and land on a vacant point immediately beyond. The leap need not be in a straight line as long as the leap follows the pattern on the board. The jumped piece is removed. Captures are compulsory. Multiple captures are allowed. In fact, a piece that can continue to jump must jump until it can jump no more.

6. If a player's piece has more than one capturing line, or if a player has more than one piece that can be used to capture enemy pieces, the player may choose any of these options.

7. The player who captures all of their opponent's pieces is the winner.

8. When no more captures can be made by either player, the game ends also. The game can be called a draw, or the player with the more pieces left on the board can be called the winner. It is up to the players how they should conclude this type of ending.
