= Four-field kono =

Korean abstract strategy game

Board for four-field kono.

Four-field kono (Korean: 네밭고누) is an abstract strategy game from Korea for two players. Each player attempts to capture the other player's pieces by jumping over their own piece and landing on the other player's piece.

Although the game is often described as being medieval, this assertion does not seem to be backed by evidence. It has, however, been recorded as being played from the late 19th century onwards. There are additional Korean two-player kono games with similar names and equipment, including well kono (우물고누) and five-field kono (오밭고누), but the boards, gameplay, and objectives for each are different. Culin mentions the existence of a six-field kono but does not provide further details.

== Goal ==
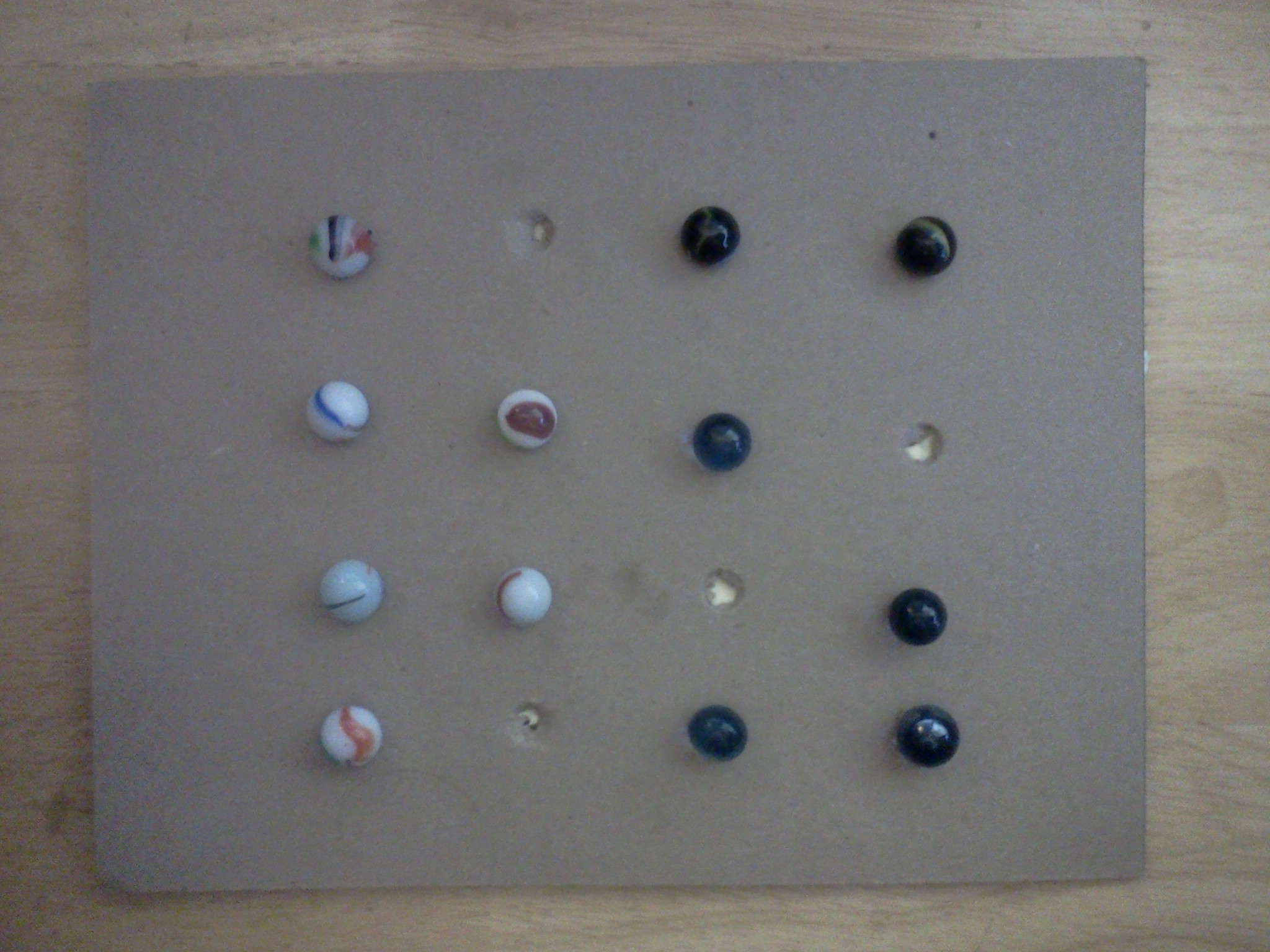
A game of four-field kono being played on an improvised board

The goal of each player is to capture the other player's pieces and reduce it to one, at which point - with only one piece - a player can no longer execute a capture. Another way to win is for a player to immobilize the other player's pieces so that they cannot move or capture.

== Equipment ==
The board is a 4×4 square grid. There are 16 markers in total, divided into two equal sets of eight pieces each. Typically the game is played with eight black and eight white marbles.

== Gameplay ==
The game is played according to these rules.

1. Players decide what color marbles to play, and who goes first.
2. The board is completely filled with the 16 marbles in the beginning. Each player's marbles are set up on their half of the board.
3. Players alternate their turns throughout the game.
4. All moves (onto a vacant space or to capture) are orthogonal, not diagonal, i.e., along the lines of a square grid.
  Example illustrating black stone at B1 capturing white stone at B3 by jumping over black stone at B2.
5. On their turn, the player may move one marble one space onto a vacant hole, or they may capture one of the other player's stones.
6. Since the board is filled up in the beginning and hence there are no vacant holes, the first move by the first player must be a capturing move.

- A capturing move requires a player's marble to jump over one of their own adjacent marbles, landing on one of the opponent's marbles, which is then removed from the board and replaced with the player's marble.
- Only one marble can be used to capture or move per turn. Multiple captures are not allowed.
- Once a marble has captured one enemy marble, the turn is completed.
- Captures are not compulsory.
