= On (game theory) =

Concept in combinatorial game theory

In mathematics, specifically combinatorial game theory, on, written as $\textbf{on}$, is the value of the loopy game where Left may only loop back the same position, while Right has no moves. $\textbf{on}$ may be represented by surreal form
$$\textbf{on}=\{\textbf{on}\mid\}.$$
Because of Right's inability to move, $\textbf{on}$ is positive, as Left automatically wins.

Its negative counterpart, off, written as $\textbf{off}$, may be represented by
$$\textbf{off}=\{\mid\textbf{off}\}.$$
$\textbf{on}$ and $\textbf{off}$ are not additive inverses. Their sum, dud (deathless universal draw), written as $\textbf{dud}$, always loops back to itself, that is,
$$\textbf{dud}=\{\textbf{dud}\mid\textbf{dud}\}.$$
$\textbf{dud}$ always results in a draw, hence its name.

$\textbf{on}$ is greater than any ender $G$, as in the difference game $\textbf{on}-G$, Left may play solely in $\textbf{on}$, while Right has no option but to play in $-G$. Because $-G$ is an ender, play in $-G$ will eventually end, and Left will win. Similarly, $\textbf{off}$ is less than any ender.

== Value-$\textbf{on}$ games ==
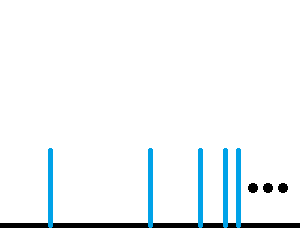
A Hackenbush position with value $\textbf{on}$.

=== Hackenbush ===
In Hackenbush, a position with infinitely many blue edges on the ground has value $\textbf{on}$, as chopping an edge still leaves infinitely many edges remaining. This example illustrates the fact that $\textbf{on}+1=\textbf{on}$; adding a blue branch won't change the position.

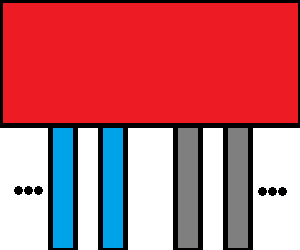
This Col position has value $\textbf{on}$.

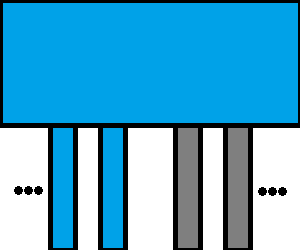
This Snort position has value $\textbf{on}$.

=== Col ===
The Col position to the left has value $\textbf{on}$. Right cannot move, while Left may color any of the empty areas, while not changing the position.

=== Snort ===
A similar Snort position has value $\textbf{on}$, shown to the right. Again, Right cannot move, while Left may color any of the empty areas, which doesn't change the position.

== See also ==
- Loopy game
- Surreal number
