= Indian and jackrabbits =

Board game

Indian and jackrabbits is a two-player abstract strategy board game from the Tiwa tribe of Taos, New Mexico. A similar game with a slightly different board is also played by the Tohono O'odham tribe of Arizona. From the outset, these games look like hunt games similar to catch the hare, the fox games of Europe, and the tiger and leopard games of Asia, because they use very similar boards, and the game mechanics (movement abilities and capturing rules) are the same, and the number of pieces each player controls is different. However, they are not the same games, because the goals are completely different. The goal of the one Indian is to capture just one of the twelve jackrabbits. The goal of the jackrabbits is to move themselves safely onto the other side of the board mirroring their initial positions.

The game is unrelated to any other despite similarities in board design and mechanics. Indian and jackrabbits may actually be a game isolate.

The game was described by Stewart Culin in his book Games of the North American Indians Volume 2: Games of Skill (1898) on page 798.

== Goal ==
The Indian wins if it captures one jackrabbit. The jackrabbits win if all of them move to the other side of the board mirroring their initial positions.

== Equipment ==
A 5 x 5 square grid is used for the Tigua version. An alquerque board is used for the Tohono O'odham version, which also consist of a 5 x 5 square grid but with additional diagonal lines. There is one Indian piece that is black, and twelve jackrabbit pieces that are white.

== Game play and rules ==
1. Players decide who will play the Indian, and who will play the jackrabbits. It is uncertain which side traditionally starts first, however, players can agree among themselves who will start first.
2. The twelve jackrabbits are initially situated on one end of the board on the intersection points, specifically, the first two rows of the board, and on the right-most and left-most intersection points of the third row. The Indian is placed on the central point of the board which is the middle intersection point of the middle row (third row).
3. This is a turn-base game. Players alternate their turns.
4. On the jackrabbits turn, one jackrabbit may be moved (in any direction) along a line onto a vacant adjacent point. In the Tigua version, there are only orthogonal lines, and therefore, rabbits can only move orthogonally. In the Tohono O'odham version, jackrabbits can move on the marked diagonal lines.
5. Similarly, on the Indian's turn, the Indian may be moved (in any direction) along a line onto a vacant adjacent point following the pattern on the Tigua or Tohono O'odham board.
6. Alternatively, the Indian can capture an adjacent jackrabbit by the short leap method as in draughts. The leap must be in a straight line, follow the pattern on the board, and land on a vacant intersection point immediately beyond the jackrabbit piece.
7. Only the Indian can capture. The jackrabbits cannot capture.
