= Buga-shadara =

Buga-shadara, also known as Bouge Shodre, is a two-player abstract strategy board game from Tuva, a republic in Siberia, Russia. It is a hunt game where one player plays the deer (which is "buga" in the Tuva language). There are two deer usually represented as the black pieces. The boars are also referred black in the referenced article "Buga-shadara a folk game from Tuva". The other player has 24 white pieces with dogs associated to them. The board consist of an Alquerque board flanked on two of its opposite sides by a square patterned board (referred to as "side-houses" in the referenced article). Because the board is in part an Alquerque board, this makes Buga-shadara a tiger hunt game (or tiger game). What makes Buga-shadara unique among tiger games are the expansion boards on the two opposite sides of the Alquerque board. They are square, whereas most are triangle-like. The word "shadara" resembles the word "shahdara". The "shah" part "is a title given to the emperors/kings and lords of Iran (historically also known as Persia).". There is a place called Shahdara Bagh in Lahore, Punjab, Pakistan, and it's thought that the word "Shahdara can be translated as "the way of kings". Shah translates as "king" and dara translates as the way of kings." The referenced article associates the boars (the two black pieces) as kings. Perhaps the boars or deer are kings, and have to find a way or have a way with the white pieces or dogs.

A variant of the game allows for White to move one of its pieces immediately after it drops a piece in the beginning portion of the game.

Buga-shadara is similar to Rimau-rimau especially Version B where the eight men are placed initially around the eight points of the central square, leaving the middle point vacant. Other than having slightly different board designs, there are 22 men in Version B of Rimau-rimau as opposed to 24 men in Buga-shadara. The opening play is also different. There seems to be no additional opening procedures for Buga-shadara, whereas, in Rimau-rimau, the tigers are allowed to initially remove one man from the board, and reallocate one of its tigers onto any vacant point. Furthermore, in Rimau-rimau the tiger can capture an odd number of enemy pieces.

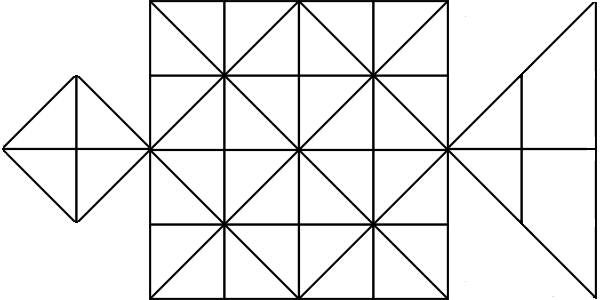
Buga-shadara board

== Equipment ==
The board is an Alquerque board flanked on two opposite sides by two square patterned boards.

There are two deer represented as 2 black pieces, and 24 Dogs represented white pieces for the other player.

== Objective ==
The Dogs (White) wins if it can block the movement of the two deer pieces (Black).

The Deer (Black) win if they capture enough dog pieces (White) so that the Dogs can never effectively accomplish their goal. If the Dogs (White) are reduced to about 10 pieces, the Deer win.

== Game Play and Rules ==
1. The two deer are initially placed on the vertex connecting the two square expansion boards onto the Alquerque board. Eight dogs are placed on the eight points on the central square surrounding the central point which is left vacant.

2. Players decide what animals (or colors) to play (Deer/Black or Dog/White). Deer to start first. Players alternate their turns.

3. The Dogs (White) must first drop the remaining 16 dogs onto any vacant point on the board before moving any of them. This will take 16 turns. The Deer (Black), however, can begin to move and capture from the beginning.

4. A dog piece (white piece) may move along a line segment onto a vacant adjacent point in a turn. Only one dog piece may be moved per turn.

5. The deer (black) pieces can move along a line segment onto a vacant adjacent point following the pattern on the board. Only one deer (black piece) may be moved (or used to capture as in the case of the deer) per turn. Only the deer can capture. The dogs cannot capture.

6. The Deer can capture a Dog piece by the short leap as in draughts. The deer piece must be adjacent to the dog piece, and leap over it onto a vacant adjacent point behind the leaped piece. The leap must be in a straight line and follow the pattern on the board. Only one dog can be captured per turn. Captures are not compulsory.

== Analysis ==
With perfect play, White wins in 40 to 50 moves.

== Related Games ==
- Rimau
- Main tapal empat
- Bagha-Chal
- Aadu puli attam
- Fox games
- Adugo
- Komikan
- Kaooa

- Kungser
