= Sz'kwa =

Chinese abstract strategy game

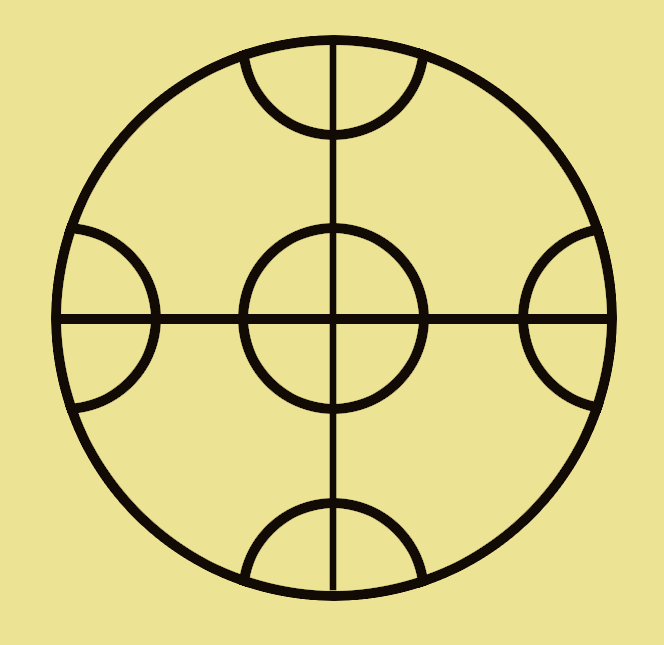
Playing board used in sz'kwa

Sz' kwa is a two-player abstract strategy game from China. It has nothing to do with go, weiqi, or baduk. The sz' kwa board is not an n x n square board like go or weiqi. Instead, the board is circular in design. The same board is used by watermelon chess and one of the ancient Roman bear games.

It is a children's game played in China. The meaning of the game's name "the game of four directions" as given by R.C. Bell is a mere invention: sz' kwa is the Cantonese for Mandarin Chinese xi gua (qi) 西瓜棋 meaning "watermelon chess".

Players typically use gravel or dirt as the board and represent the pieces using shells, nuts, or pebbles. The author Clifford A. Pickover rated a "Hyperdimensional Sz'kwa" challenge as "extremely difficult".

== Goal ==
To capture the most enemy pieces.

== Equipment ==
The board is composed of a large circle with an inner middle circle. Four semicircles form a north, south, east, and west arrangement in the interior of the larger circle. The large circle and the smaller middle circle are divided equally into four pie slices. This creates for twenty-one intersection points where the pieces are played upon.

Each player has 20 pieces. One plays the black pieces, and the other plays the white pieces, however, any two colors or distinguishable objects will do.

== Game play ==
The board is empty in the beginning.

Players decide what colors to play, and who starts first.

Players drop one of their pieces on any vacant intersection point on the board. Only one piece can be dropped per turn. Players alternate their turns.

Enemy pieces can be captured as long as they are surrounded completely by the player's pieces.

The game ends when there are no more vacant intersection points to drop a piece onto, or when one player has exhausted all their pieces.

== Related games ==
- Watermelon chess
- Bear games
