= Kolowis Awithlaknannai =

Board game

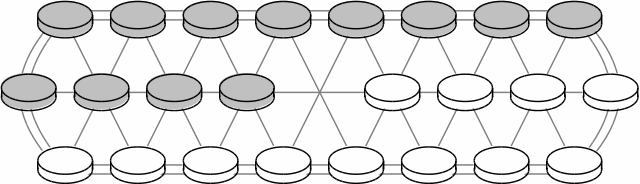
Awithlaknannai

Kolowis Awithlaknannai (also known as fighting serpents) is a two-player strategy board game from the Zuni Native American Indians. It was described by Stewart Culin in his book Games of the North American Indians (1907), and may have been the first publication of the game. It was later described in R.C. Bell's book Board and Table Games from Many Civilizations (1969). R.C. Bell coined the term fighting serpents, but provides no explanation for it. Perhaps the black and white pieces are laid out in the beginning of the game in such a way that it looks like two serpents fighting.

The game is a relative of draughts and alquerque. Captures are done by jumping over pieces. The Spanish are thought to have brought the game of alquerque to America several centuries ago, and the game's development may have been influenced; however, there is no conclusive proof. Furthermore, the board is neither a square board or an alquerque board. The board's length far exceeds its width. To say the least, fighting serpents is a unique variant. The game is actually more related to alquerque than draughts, because pieces can move in any direction from the start of the game, and there is no back row or promotion to king. Moreover, the board is made up of linear patterns instead of squares.

== Goal ==
The goal of the game is to eliminate the other player's pieces. If that's not possible, then the player with the most pieces left in the game is the winner. Another way to win is to block the other player's movements. A player cannot pass their turn.

== Equipment ==
The board consist of three parallel horizontal lines (also called rows) joined together by several leaning (left and right) diagonal lines. A curve line also connects the ends of the board. There are 16 intersection points on the top and bottom row. There are 17 intersection points in the middle row. The intersection points are where the pieces can be played at.

Each player has 23 pieces. One plays the black pieces, and the other plays the white pieces. However, any two colors or distinguishable objects are appropriate.

== Rules and gameplay ==
1. Each player's 23 pieces are initially placed on all the intersection points of the row closest to him or her. They are also placed on the right-half side of the middle row from the view of each player. Only the middle point, and the two points on the ends are empty at the beginning.
2. It is arbitrary which player starts first. The first player however must move their piece onto the middle point which will then be captured by the other player as captures are compulsory. For this reason, it is thought that the first player has a disadvantage.
3. There are two types of movements: non-capturing moves, and capturing moves. A piece can be moved one space (non-capturing move) per turn. The move must follow the pattern on the board. Or a piece can capture an enemy piece (capturing move). This move must also follow the pattern on the board also. Captures are similar to those in Draughts and Alquerque. A player's piece jumps over an adjacent enemy piece, and lands on a vacant spot beyond it. The jump need not be straight as long as it lands on a spot immediately beyond the enemy piece and follows the pattern on the board. Captured pieces are removed from the board. Captures are compulsory.
4. Multiple captures are allowed, however the player can decide how many captures to be made.

== See also ==
- Awithlaknannai Mosona
