= Five-field kono =

Korean abstract strategy board game

- The board in its starting position. Pieces move diagonally to empty adjacent points.
- Players: 2
- Setup time: 1 minute
- Playing time: 10 minutes
- Chance: None
- Skills: Strategy

Five-field kono (Korean: 오밭고누) is a Korean abstract strategy game. A player wins by moving all of their pieces into the starting locations of their opponent's pieces.

== Rules ==
The players take turns moving one of their pieces one square diagonally. The first player to move all of their pieces to their opponent's starting squares wins.

== See also ==
- Four-field kono
- Gonu

== Bibliography ==
- Bell, R. C. (1979). Board and table games from many civilizations (Revised ed.). New York: Dover Publications, Inc. p. 98. ISBN 978-0-486-23855-5.
- Culin, Stewart (1895). Korean Games. Philadelphia. p. 102.
