= Pong Hau K'i =

Chinese board game

Pong Hau K'i (Chinese: 裤裆棋; pinyin: kùdāng qí, Cantonese: Pong Hau K'i/bong1 hau2 kei4 崩口棋) is a Chinese traditional board game for two players. In Korea, it is known as Ou-moul-ko-no or Umul Gonu (우물고누) or as Gang Gonu (강고누). "Umul" translates as "a spring", and the appearance of the board is like that of a spring in the center, with water running out in all directions. "Gang" translates as "river", and has a similar interpretation. Equivalent games are also played in Thailand (Sua tok tong) and in northern India (Hindustani?: Do-guti).

The board consists of 5 vertices and 7 edges. Each player has two pieces. Players take turns to move. At each turn, the player moves one of their two pieces into the adjacent vacant vertex. If a player can't move, they lose.

Only one type of position can make a player lose. If both players play perfectly, the game continues endlessly with no winner.

It is a children's game in both China and Korea, and is often used for childhood education.

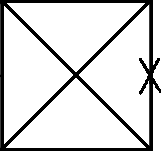
One kind of board.

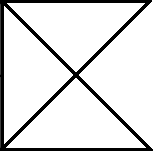
One kind of board, esp. for Pong Hau K'i.

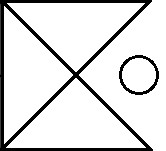
One kind of board.

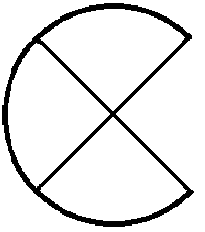
One kind of board, esp. for Umul Gonu.

== Gameplay ==
First few moves in Pong Hau K'i
Step	Illus.	Notes
1		The starting position for Pong Hau K'i is shown on the left. The two players are "Red" and "Blue", with Red being the first player.
2		The central spot is left unoccupied initially. The first move must be Red moving either of their pieces to the center. By symmetry, those two possible moves for Red are equivalent.
3		There is only one move for Blue, either the top (if the top piece for Red was moved) or the bottom (if the bottom piece for Red was moved), to the right.
4		Red only has one move available, for the piece in the center. The first three ply of moves for the two players are forced, and will always result in the positions shown at the bottom, which are equivalent.

First few moves in Umul Gonu
Step	Illus.	Notes
1		Umul Gonu begins differently: "Red" has both pieces at the top, and "Blue" has both pieces at the bottom.
2		By itself, this would allow Red to win the game on their first move, so that particular first move (shown on the left) is forbidden.
3		Blue's first move is forced.
4		The result is that the first three moves are also forced and, surprisingly, after three moves you find yourself in the same position as after three moves of Pong Hau K'i. The games, of course, are then equivalent.

== Analysis ==
This game has been analyzed by P. Straffin, who showed that it is a draw so long as both players can see 2-ply ahead, i.e. see the results of their move and of what their opponent would do in response.

Additional example moves in Pong Hau K'i
Step	Illus.				Notes
1					In particular, any win in Pong Hau K'i must go through the position shown here, or a symmetrically equivalent position, with Red to move.
2	(1)	(2)			Red has two choices: (1) They can move their top-right piece to the left, along the top edge; or (2) They can move their bottom-left piece up along the left edge.
3	(1) Play continues	(2A) Blue WIN	(2B)		In case (1), the game continues, as Blue only can move their center piece to the top-right, resulting in basically the same position as the start. But in case (2), the game will almost surely end quickly. If Blue then moves their bottom-right piece to the left (2A), they win, as Red has no valid moves. If Blue is foolish enough to move their center piece instead to the bottom-right (2B), then Red wins by moving their top-right piece to the center (2Ba). Of course, Red could also move their top-left piece to the center (2Bb), in which case play will continue.
3	(1) Play continues	(2A) Blue WIN	(2Ba) Red WIN	(2Bb) Play continues	

Thus with "2-ply lookahead", player Red can see the result of a potential bad move of the bottom piece (the first ply, choice 2), realize that Blue then has a winning move (choice 2A of the second ply), and hence choose to not make that move.

== See also ==
In China, there are some traditional board games like Pong Hau K'i.

- 鋤棋
- 牛角棋
- 擠樓梯
- 趕羊旦
- 斜方棋

In Korea, there are some traditional board games like Unul Gonu

- Gonu(고누)
