= Leopard hunt game =

Group of board games

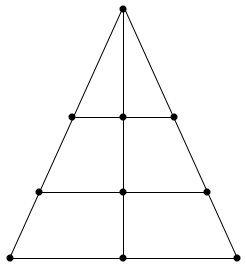
Typical board. The 6 lines define 10 intersection points on which pieces can move

Typical board.

Leopard hunt games or simply leopard games are a group of abstract strategy games of Southeast Asian origin, similar in spirit to European fox games. However, they are believed to have arisen independently. The games are usually played on a triangular board with three horizontal parallel lines (including the triangle's base) intersecting the other two sides of the triangle and a vertical bisector. Though a number of variants exist, the basic principle of the game sees one player with a single piece (the hunter) and the other playing six or seven pieces (the hunted). Players move pieces in turn along the board's lines. The objective for the hunter is to capture the opponents pieces by "jumping" over them as in checkers while the hunted seeks to corner the hunter so that it has no possible move.

Regional variants include:

- Aadu puli attam
- Demala diviyan keliya
- Hat diviyan keliya
- Len Choa
- Meurimueng-rimueng-do
- Pulijudam
