= Rimau-rimau =

Malaysian board game

Rimau-rimau is a two-player abstract strategy board game that belongs to the hunt game family. This family includes games like bagh-chal, main tapal empat, aadu puli attam, catch the hare, sua ghin gnua, the fox games, buga-shadara, and many more. Rimau-rimau is the plural of rimau which is an abbreviation of the word harimau, meaning 'tiger' in the Malay language. Therefore, rimau-rimau means 'tigers'. The several hunters attempting to surround and immobilize the tigers are called orang-orang, which is the plural of orang, meaning 'man'. Therefore, orang-orang means 'men' and there are twenty-two or twenty-four of them, depending on which version of the game is played. The game originates from Malaysia.

Rimau-rimau is specifically part of the tiger hunt game family (or tiger game family) since its board consists in part of an alquerque board. In contrast, leopard games are also hunt games, but use a more triangular-patterned board and not an alquerque-based board. Fox games are also hunt games, but use a patterned board that resembles a cross.

Two versions of this game are described below: Version A and Version B. Both use two rimau-rimau (two tigers). The main difference is that Version A uses 24 orang-orang while Version B uses only 22 orang-orang.

There is also a single rimau version to this game, aptly called rimau, with very similar rules.

Stewart Culin in his book Chess and Playing Cards: Catalogue of Games and Implements for Divination Exhibited by the United States National Museum in Connection with the Department of Archaeology and Paleontology of the University of Pennsylvania at the Cotton States and International Exposition (1898) briefly describes the game with an illustration and refers to it as "Dam Hariman or tiger game, the Malayan game of fox and geese". Culin does not actually describe the rules, but since he compares it to fox and geese, then it can be assumed to be a hunt game; moreover it is in the section of the book that deals with hunt games.

There are many names and variants of the game (see Variants section).

From here on, the rimau or rimau-rimau will be simply referred to as tiger and tigers respectively. The same also applies to the orang and orang-orang, and they will be referred to as man and men respectively.

== Setup ==
Blank board

The game consists of a standard alquerque board, but flanked on two of its opposite sides are triangular boards called gunung, which means 'mountain'. There are two black pieces called tigers, and 22 or 24 white pieces called men. Version A has 24 men, and version B has 22 men.

== Rules ==
Two versions of this game are described.

=== Version A ===
Starting position for Version A

Starting position and opening phase

1. In the beginning the rimau pieces representing the tigers are placed at the two apex nodes of both mountains, where each connects to the alquerque board.
2. Nine orang pieces are initially placed on the nine intersection points of the central square of the alquerque board, leaving 26 nodes unoccupied.
3. The tiger player moves first and removes any 3 orang pieces from the board, leaving 29 nodes unoccupied. To complete the first turn, the tiger player then may also pick up either one of the rimau pieces and place it on any empty intersection point on the board, or the tiger player can simply leave both rimau pieces where they are already. The tiger player can move only one rimau piece in a single turn.
4. The man player moves next, and must place one of the remaining 15 orang pieces on any vacant intersection point on the board. Only one orang can be added per turn, so in the opening phase of the game, the first fifteen man player turns are used to place the orang pieces.

Movement and capture phase

1. Players alternate their turns throughout the game, with the tiger player taking the odd-numbered turns and the man player taking even-numbered turns.
2. The tiger player can move a single rimau piece and capture orang-orang during their turns, starting with turn 3. Moving both rimau pieces during a single turn is not allowed.
3. When there is an adjacent node that is vacant and connected to the present node by a line, one of the rimau pieces can move by a single space to that node during the tiger player's turn.
4. However, as an alternative, the tiger player may choose to capture orang piece(s) using one rimau piece during their turn. The capture must take an odd number of orang pieces (e.g., 1, 3, 5, or 7) and must follow a straight line. That is, if more than one orang piece is captured (i.e. 3, 5, or 7), those pieces must be in a contiguous straight line (without any gaps) that follows the pattern on the board. To capture the pieces, the rimau must be adjacent to the orang or line of orang pieces, and leap over them onto the vacant node immediately beyond. The orang pieces that were jumped are removed. Once the orang piece(s) are leaped over and captured, the tiger player's turn is finished and the rimau can no longer capture further or move. Captures are not compulsory.
5. After the 15 orang-orang have been dropped during the opening phase, the man player can then move an orang piece during their turn, starting with turn 32. Only one orang may be moved per turn. Like the rimau, each orang can be moved in any available direction along a line by a single space to a vacant adjacent intersection point, but the man player cannot capture using the same leaping mechanic.
6. The odd-numbered requirement for capture allows the man player to block the rimau by placing or moving two (or an even number) orang pieces next to the rimau.

Endgame

1. If the tiger player has captured all the orang pieces, or there are not enough orang pieces left to block the movement of the rimau pieces, the tiger player wins.
2. If the man player has immobilized both rimau pieces by leaving them with no legal moves, the man player wins.

If the man player has been reduced to 10 or 11 remaining orang pieces, the man player will usually resign as there is not enough orang pieces left to effectively immobilize the rimau pieces.

=== Version B ===
Starting position for Version B

Version B has a slightly different opening phase. Otherwise, gameplay is exactly the same in both Version A and Version B for movement, capturing, and winning conditions.

Differences compared to Version A

- Version B uses 22 orang pieces in total (Version A uses 24)
- Version B places 8 orang pieces at the start of the game in the center of the board (Version A places 9)
- The central node of the alquerque board is left unoccupied during the start of Version B
- During the opening turn by the tiger player, only one orang piece is removed (Version A removes 3)
- The 14 remaining orang pieces are placed during the opening phase of Version B (Version A has 15)

== Variants ==
=== Main Machan ===
A similar game to rimau-rimau, especially Version A, is played by the Iban tribe in Borneo, called main machan. There are a few differences, however; one of which is that there are 28 anak ('children') in main machan as compared to 24 or 22 orang-orang ('men') in rimau-rimau. Children are playing the role of the men in this case. Furthermore, instead of rimau-rimau ('tigers'), the two pieces are called endo ('women') in main machan. Lastly, the anak can jump over an endo using the short leap method as in draughts, but the endo piece is not captured. There may be more variations of the game with differences in rules, board design, and number of pieces. An endo piece can capture an odd number of anak pieces as in rimau-rimau, and the board used is the same as in rimau-rimau.

=== Meurimueng-rimueng ===
Another account from the book "The Achehnese" (1906) states that these types of games were referred to as Machanan or the 'tiger game' in Java, but referred to as meurimueng-rimueng ('tiger game') among the Acehnese. Meurimueng-rimueng is described slightly differently from both versions of Rimau-rimau. It consists of the usual two tigers, but with 23 sheep (as opposed to 22 or 24 men). It is most similar to Version B as the game begins with eight sheep on the eight intersection points surrounding the central point of the board. But instead of the central intersection point being left empty, the two tiger pieces are placed on it. It does not specifically mention if the two tigers are stacked on top of one another on the central point, or if the second tiger is entered separately and after the first tiger has moved away from the central point. Moreover, the remaining 15 sheep are only entered if a sheep on the board is captured. This means that only at most eight sheep are allowed on the board at any time, but can eight sheep effectively block the two tigers? Whether this is an accurate description of the game is questionable. The tigers are allowed to capture an odd number of sheep as in rimau-rimau, and the same board is used.

=== Rimoe ===
The Acehnese live in northern Sumatra, but on the island of Simeulue (or Simaloer or Simalur) which is just west of Sumatra, the inhabitants play a similar game and may fill in some of the rule deficiencies found for meurimueng-rimueng, the previous game described above. It is similar to Version B of rimau-rimau. Edw. Jacobson wrote in Tijdschrift Voor Indische Taal-, Land- En Volkenkunde (1919), a collection of articles written in Dutch, and spelled the name of the game as rimoe (which sounds like rimau), and Jacobson states that it is the Malay rimau or the tiger game. The game was also described by H.J.R. Murray in A History of Board-Games Other Than Chess (1952), and references Edw. Jacobson's work as his source. The game uses the same board. There are 24 pieces called ana (which means child in some Austronesian languages, which the inhabitants of Simuelue speak) played by one player. There is also one or two rimoe or radjo (depending upon the version) played by the other player. In the beginning only eight ana are placed on the eight intersection points surrounding the central point of the board. If playing with the version with one rimoe, then that one rimoe is placed on the central intersection point. If playing with the version with two rimoe, then both rimoe are placed on the central intersection point, hence two pieces are occupying one intersection point. In both versions, the rimoe start first with each player alternating their turns. The rimoe, having been completely surrounded by ana pieces, jumps over one along a marked line and landing on a vacant intersection point immediately beyond as in rimau-rimau, and removes the ana from the board. In the version with two rimoe, the player may choose any one of the two rimoe to jump over an ana. Only one rimoe may be used in a turn throughout the game. In both versions, the person playing with the ana pieces must first enter the remaining 16 ana pieces (one piece per turn) before they can move any of the pieces on the board. After all 16 ana pieces have been dropped, the ana pieces may be moved to any adjacent vacant intersection point along a marked line. Only one ana piece may be moved in a turn. Ana pieces cannot capture or perform jumps. The person playing with the rimoe piece or pieces may move a rimoe piece following a marked line onto a vacant adjacent intersection point. In the single rimoe version, the rimoe may jump over an adjacent odd number of ana pieces as in rimau-rimau. If playing with the version with two rimoe, the rimoe may capture no more than one ana per turn. The person playing the rimoe pieces may only perform a move or a capture in a turn, but not both. The objective of the person playing the ana pieces is to hem in or trap the rimoe piece or pieces as in rimau-rimau. The objective of the person playing the rimoe piece or pieces is to capture all the ana pieces. Jacobson writes that rimoe is a favorite pastime among the inhabitants of Simuelue, and are found on the plank floors of many homes or suraës incised (a sura is a place where religious instruction is given, or serves as a lodge for foreigners, especially in Simeulue). Game boards (that are separate from the floor or wall) are never to be found. The two triangle board sections are called alas among the inhabitants of Simeulue, and it means 'beach', but among the Malay it is often referred to as a forest (or mountain).

=== Madranggam ===
Another variant which is briefly described in "The Achehnese" (1906) is the game Madranggam (or Mudranggam) which is called "four tigers and sixteen sheep". The same board is used in Machanan/meurimueng-rimueng which is the rimau-rimau board, but it is not explicitly mentioned whether a tiger can capture an odd number of sheep. Perhaps a similar game is described by Walter William Skeat in his work Malay magic (1900) which he refers to as Main Rimau ("Tiger" Game) or Main Rimau Kambing ("Tiger and Goat" Game) as this game usually consists of four tigers and a dozen goats. However, the design of the board is not described or referenced, nor whether or not the tiger is permitted to capture an odd number of goats.

=== Main rimau ===
Main rimau is also the name for a game played in the state of Kelantan in Malaysia, and it was described by A.H. Hill in the Journal of the Malayan Branch of the Royal Asiatic Society (1952) under the article "Some Kelantan Games and Entertainments". But unlike Rimau-rimau and the other variants, the standard Alquerque board is only used; the two triangular boards that normally flank it on opposite sides are missing. There are two rimau and twenty lěmbu ('cattle'), and they are traditionally represented by fruits or pebbles. The game starts with some of the pieces on the board already. The two rimau are placed on two opposite outer rows (or columns) of the board, and specifically on the middle point of the row or column; this part of the setup is essentially the same as that of Rimau-rimau. Four lěmbu are placed on the four points diagonally adjacent to the central point of the board. Although not explicitly described in the article, the remaining lěmbu may be assumed to be entered one piece per turn as in Rimau-rimau and the other variants. But unlike Rimau-rimau and the other variants, the lěmbu may possibly be placed onto a point already occupied by one or more lěmbu. The rimau move and capture similarly as in Rimau-rimau except it can only capture one lěmbu in a turn; the rimau cannot capture a line of an odd number (greater than one) of lěmbu as in Rimau-rimau. The turn ends after the capture of the one lěmbu. As mentioned earlier, more than one lěmbu may occupy a point, and the rimau is allowed to leap over them, but only capture one of the lěmbu. The lěmbu move similarly as in the orang-orang of Rimau-rimau but it can also move onto a point already occupied by one or more lěmbu. The lěmbu are not allowed to move onto the same point occupied by a rimau. The lěmbu cannot capture. The objective for both parties is the same as in Rimau-rimau.

== Rimau-rimau (as described by Plischke) ==
A Czech ethnographer, Dr. Karl Plischke (Czech: Karel Plischke), published an article in 1890 in German "Kurze Mittheilung Ueber Zwei Malayische Spiele" (English: Short Message About Two Malay Games) describing a slight variant of Version B. It was described to him by a 19 year old Malay man from Singapore of the name "Saman" in 1889. Plischke states that in the beginning of the game the 8 orang-orang are placed according to Version B, but that each of the 2 rimau are placed on any two vacant points on the board, or that possibly the 2 rimau can be both placed together on the central point of the board (as in the 2 rimau version of Rimoe). The only other difference from Version B is that a rimau can only capture one orang in a turn; it cannot capture a multiple number of orang-orang (not even an odd number except one).

== Asymmetry ==
Rimau-rimau is an asymmetric game in that the pieces controlled by one player are different from the pieces controlled by the other player. Tiger pieces can capture, whereas men can only block the tigers. Furthermore, the number of pieces is different for each player. The tiger player controls the two tiger pieces, and the man player controls the 22 or 24 man pieces. Lastly, the goals of each player are different. The goal of the tigers is to eliminate as many men as possible which would prevent the men from blocking their movements. However, the goal of the men is to block the movements of the tigers.

== Related games ==
- Rimau
- Buga-shadara
- Main tapal empat
- Bagh-chal
- Aadu puli attam
- Fox games
- Adugo
- Komikan
- Kaooa
