= Len choa =

Game board for len choa, a leopard hunt game

Len choa is a two-player abstract strategy game from southern Thailand (formerly called Siam), first documented by Captain James Low in 1839. It is a Leopard hunt game (or Leopard game). One tiger is going up against six leopards. The leopards attempt to surround and trap the tiger while the tiger attempts to capture enough of them (usually 3) so that the leopards can not immobilize the tiger. It is unknown how old the game is, and it is only known from the periodical Asiatic Researches; or, Transactions of the Society, Instituted in Bengal, For Inquiring into The History, The Antiquities, The Arts and Sciences, and Literature of Asian, Second Part of the Twentieth Volume and specifically in chapter X On Siamese Literature (1839) in which Low authored. It is very similar to a game played in Sri Lanka called Hat diviyan keliya.

== Goal ==
Leopards win if they surround and immobilize the one tiger. That is, the tiger can not move on its turn.

The tiger wins if it captures three leopards, as there are not enough of them to immobilize the tiger.

== Equipment ==
The board used is a triangle dissected by two lines across its breadth, and one line across its length through its central axis. This makes for 10 intersection points. There are six white pieces representing the leopards, and one black piece representing the tiger. The leopard pieces and tiger piece are played on the intersection points.

== Game play and rules ==
1. Players decide what animal to play. Players alternate their turns throughout the game. The board is empty in the beginning with the exception to the tiger piece which is placed on the top vertex of the triangle (the top vertex is the corner of the triangle where the vertical line running down the length of the triangle dissects it).
2. The leopards start first. All six leopard pieces must be dropped first before any of them can be moved. Only one leopard piece can be dropped per turn, and they are dropped onto any vacant point on the board during the Leopard's turn.
3. The tiger on its turn may either move the tiger one space onto a vacant point following the pattern on the board, or use it to capture a leopard piece.
4. After all the leopards have been dropped, a leopard can move one space per turn onto a vacant point following the pattern on the board. Only one leopard may be moved per turn. Unlike the tiger, leopards can not capture.
5. The tiger captures a leopard by the short leap as in draughts. The tiger must be adjacent to the leopard, and leap over it onto a vacant point on the other side following the pattern on the board. Only one capture is allowed per turn. Captures are not compulsory.

== Related games ==
- Hat diviyan keliya
