= Hat diviyan keliya =

Traditional Sri Lankan board game

Game board for hat diviyan keliya, a leopard hunt game

Hat diviyan keliya is a two-player abstract strategy game from Sri Lanka (formerly called Ceylon). It is a Leopard hunt game (or Leopard game). One tiger is going up against seven leopards. The leopards attempt to surround and trap the tiger while the tiger attempts to capture enough of them so that the leopards can not trap it.

The game was originally documented as Hatdiviyan or "Seven Leopards" by Leopold Ludovici in The Journal of the Ceylon Branch of the Royal Asiatic Society (1873), and specifically in the chapter entitled The Sports and Games of the Singhalese which he wrote himself, he provides a written description of the game and an illustration. The game was then documented by Henry Parker as Hat diviyan keliya in his work Ancient Ceylon: An Account of the Aborigines and of Part of the Early Civilisation (1909), and he transcribed its name as The Game of the Seven Leopards. Parker provides a written description of the game, but not a diagram. He does however reference Ludovici as a source for the game which included a diagram. Parker actually misspells Ludovici's last name as Ludovisi. The game is also described by the Czech language website Klub přátel deskových her which refers to it as Sedm pardálů which when translated into English means seven panthers (or seven leopards), and references Miloš Zapletal work Špalíček her (1988). The website describes two variants of the game, the one described by Ludovici and Parker and another one with a slightly larger board (consisting of an extra row of three intersection points) with two tigers and eight leopards.

There may be a very similar game played in Thailand called Len Choa played with six leopards, but as there was no illustration of the board provided in the original documentation of Len Choa, and the written description of Len Choa is vague, it is therefore uncertain if the boards are the same.

The following setup and rules are based upon Leopold Ludovici's description of the game.

== Setup ==
The board consist of an isosceles triangle with two parallel lines running across its breadth, and one line running down its length from the apex to the midpoint of the base. This makes for 10 intersection points (here-in-forth referred to as "points").

There are seven pieces representing the leopards, and one piece representing the tiger. Leopard and tiger pieces should be distinguishable from one another by color or design.

Players decide what animal to play. The board is empty.

== Rules ==
- Players alternate their turns throughout the game.
- The tiger player moves first, and may place the sole tiger piece on any point on the board. (Note: Ludovici writes that it is often placed on the apex of the triangle as it is the most advantageous position.)
- The leopard player must drop all seven leopard pieces first before any of them can be moved on the board. Only one leopard piece may be dropped per turn, and they are dropped onto any vacant point on the board.
- The tiger player on its turn may either move the tiger along a line onto a vacant adjacent point following the pattern on the board, or attempt to capture a leopard.
- After all seven leopard pieces have been dropped, the leopard player for the remainder of the game may move one of its pieces onto an adjacent vacant point following the pattern on the board. Leopards can not capture, nor perform any leaps over the tiger or fellow leopards.
- The tiger captures a leopard by the short leap as in draughts. The tiger must be adjacent to the leopard, and leap over it (in a straight line) onto a vacant point immediately beyond following the pattern on the board. The captured piece is removed from the board. Only one capture is allowed per turn. Captures are not compulsory.
- Leopards win if they trap the one tiger. That is, the tiger can not move on its turn. The tiger wins if it captures enough leopards where they can no longer effectively block the tiger's movements.
