= Watermelon chess =

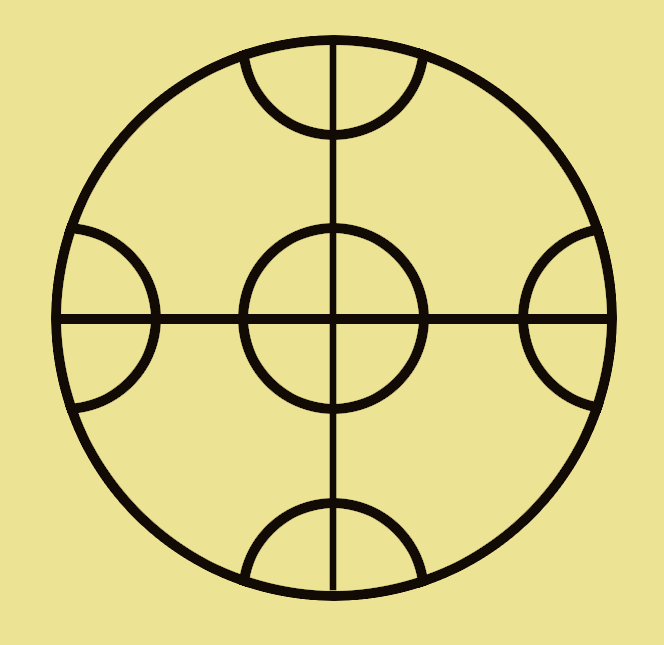
Playing board for watermelon chess

Watermelon chess is a two-player abstract strategy game from China where it is known as xi gua qi. It is also known as the surround game and globe. Played on a network of curved lines, players take turns to move a piece, capturing the opponent's pieces by surrounding them. The game is related to the bear games of the ancient Romans, and uses the same board as some of them. The Go variant sz'kwa uses the same board.

Watermelon chess is a pebble game similar to Go , though unrelated to the game of chess.

== Equipment ==
Game board on a rock at THSR Hsinchu Station Tu Di Gong Temple, Taiwan

The board is composed of a large circle with an inner middle circle. Four semicircles form a north, south, east, and west arrangement in the interior of the larger circle. The large circle and the smaller middle circle are divided equally into four pie slices. This creates for twenty-one intersection points where the pieces are played upon.

Each player has six pieces. One player plays the black pieces, and the other player plays the white pieces, however, any two colors or distinguishable objects will do.

== Rules ==
Players decide what colors to play, and who starts first.

Each player's six pieces are initially placed on the six closest intersection points on their side of the board.

Players alternate their turns, and move one piece per turn. A piece can move one space per turn following the pattern on the board.

Enemy pieces can be captured if surrounded by the player's pieces so that it cannot move. Only one enemy piece can be captured per turn. Captured pieces are removed from the board.

The goal is to reduce the opponent's numbers to two pieces.

== Comparison to bear games ==
The game is related to the bear games of ancient Rome, and uses the same board as some of them. The difference is that in watermelon chess each player has six pieces, whereas in the bear games, there are three hunters played by one player, and one bear played by the other player. Furthermore, in the bear games, only the hunters can surround and immobilize the movements of the one bear; the bear merely moves to avoid this as it is impossible for the bear itself to immobilize any of the hunters. In watermelon chess, every piece can participate in immobilizing the other player's pieces; furthermore, surrounded enemy pieces are captured.
