= Rimau =

Rimau is a two-player abstract strategy board game from Malaysia. It is a hunt game, and specifically a tiger hunt game (or tiger game) since it uses an expanded alquerque board. One tiger is being hunted by 24 men. The tiger attempts to eat the men, and the men attempt to trap the tiger. Unique to rimau (and the two-tiger variant rimau-rimau), the tiger can capture a line of men in a single leap. There must be an odd number of men in the line, and they must be adjacent to one another. In most hunt games, the tiger, leopard, or fox is only able to capture one prey in a leap.

== Origins ==
Blank board for the abstract strategy game rimau

Rimau in Malay means "tiger". The men are called orang-orang, the plural of orang which means "man".

Rimau is played on the same board as the game rimau-rimau, which has two tigers and 22 or 24 men. Both games share similar rules.

Rimau is a hunt game, specifically a tiger hunt game (or tiger game); this family of hunt games uses an alquerque board or a variant thereof, including games like rimau-rimau, bagh-chal ("tigers and goats" in Nepali), and main tapal empat. In contrast, leopard hunt games use a more triangular board and not an alquerque-based board. Similarly, fox games are also hunt games, but use a cross-shaped board.

== Goal ==
The men win if they block and immobilize the tiger's movements.

The tiger wins if they capture all the men, or capture enough men so that the men cannot effectively block and immobilize its movements. This usually happens when there are only 10 or 11 men left on the board.

== Equipment ==
The game uses an expanded alquerque board, supplemented by two triangular mountains (gunung in Malay) with their apexes touching the middle of opposing sides of the square alquerque board. There are 25 nodes on the central alquerque square where pieces can be played, and 7 nodes on each gunung, although the apex of each gunung is shared with a node on the alquerque square, making 37 nodes on the rimau board in total.

There is 1 black rimau piece controlled by the player taking the side of the tiger, and 24 white orang pieces controlled by the opposing player who takes the side of the men.

== Game play and rules ==
=== Opening (placement) phase ===
Initial starting position for rimau

1. In the beginning the rimau piece representing the tiger is placed at the apex node of one of the two mountains where it connects to the alquerque board. Nine men are initially placed on the nine intersection points of the central square of the alquerque board, leaving 27 nodes unoccupied.
2. The tiger player moves first and removes any 3 men from the board, leaving 30 nodes unoccupied. To complete the first turn, the tiger player then may also pick up the rimau and place it on any empty intersection point on the board, or the tiger player can simply leave the rimau where it is already.
3. The man player moves next, and must place one of the remaining 15 orang pieces on any vacant intersection point on the board. Only one orang can be added per turn, so in the opening phase of the game, the first fifteen man player turns are used to place the orang pieces.

=== Movement phase ===
1. Players alternate their turns throughout the game, with the tiger player taking the odd-numbered turns and the man player taking even-numbered turns.
2. The tiger player can move the rimau and capture orang-orang starting with turn 3.
3. When there is an adjacent node that is vacant and connected to the present node by a line, the rimau can move by a single space to that node during the tiger player's turn.
4. However, as an alternative, the tiger player may choose to capture orang piece(s) during their turn. The capture must take an odd number of orang pieces (e.g., 1, 3, 5, or 7) and must follow a straight line. That is, if more than one orang piece is captured (i.e. 3, 5, or 7), those pieces must be in a contiguous straight line (without any gaps) that follows the pattern on the board. To capture the pieces, the rimau must be adjacent to the orang or line of orang pieces, and leap over them onto the vacant node immediately beyond. The orang pieces that were jumped are removed. Once the orang piece(s) are leaped over and captured, the tiger player's turn is finished and the rimau can no longer capture further or move. Captures are not compulsory.
5. After the 15 orang-orang have been dropped during the opening phase, the man player can then move an orang piece during their turn, starting with turn 32. Only one orang may be moved per turn. Like the rimau, each orang can be moved in any available direction along a line by a single space to a vacant adjacent intersection point, but the man player cannot capture using the same leaping mechanic.
6. The odd-numbered requirement for capture allows the man player to block the rimau by placing or moving two (or an even number) orang pieces next to the rimau.

=== Endgame ===
Tiger player example moves

The only legal move for the tiger player is b2 to b4, capturing the orang at b3.

The tiger player has two legal moves, a3 to a5 or a3 to e3, capturing three orang pieces.

1. If the tiger player has captured all the orang pieces, the tiger player wins.
2. If the man player has immobilized the rimau by leaving it with no legal moves, the man player wins.

If the man player has been reduced to 10 or 11 remaining orang pieces, the man player will usually resign as there is not enough orang pieces left to effectively immobilize the rimau.

=== Asymmetry ===
Like all hunt games, Rimau is an asymmetric game in that the pieces controlled by one player are different from the pieces controlled by the other player. A tiger can capture whereas men can only simply block the tigers. Furthermore, the number of pieces is different for each player. The tiger player controls one tiger piece, and the man player controls the 24 man pieces. Lastly, the goals of each player are different. The goal of the tiger is to eliminate as many men as possible which would prevent the men from blocking its movements. However, the goal of the men is to block the movement of the tiger.

== Related games ==
- Rimau-rimau
- Main tapal empat
- Bagh-chal
- Adugo
- Komikan
- Bagh bandi
- Sher-bakar
- Catch the hare
- Buga-shadara
