= Komikan =

Board game

Komikan gameboard

Komikan (from the Mapuche kom ikan "to eat all") is a two-player abstract strategy board game of the Mapuches (known by the Spaniards as the Araucanians) from Chile and Argentina. The same game is also played by the Incas under the name Taptana, Komina, Comina, Cumi, Puma, or Inca Chess. In modern Quechua, the language of the ethnolinguistic group that are the descendants of the Incas, Taptana means "chess". It is known by the Aymaras, a neighboring ethnolinguistic group to the Quechuan people, as kumisiña. Throughout South America the game is known as El león y las ovejas which literally means "the lion and the sheep". The lion is actually a puma as there are no lions native to the Americas. The Mapuches also call it El Leoncito. J. I. Molina, in 1787, described it as ‘el artificioso juego del ajedrez, al cual dan el nombre de comican’ which translates to "the ingenious game of chess to which they (the Mapuche) give the name comican". Komikan may actually be the same game as Adugo (Jaguar and Dogs) as played by the Bororó people of Brazil. In 1898, Stewart Culin, named a game played in Peru as Solitario. The same name was also used by the game historian, Murray, in 1952. The game may also be known in Peru as Kukuli. Komikan is a hunt game, and specifically a tiger hunt game (or tiger game) since it uses an expanded Alquerque board. In Komikan, one player has only a single piece, usually called a "puma" or "jaguar", or "kom ikelu" (Mapuche, "the one which eats all"), or "leon" (Spanish, "lion"), which can move one space at a time or capture the other player's pieces by hopping over them. The other player has twelve pieces, usually called "sheep", "goats", perros ("dogs") or perritos ("little dogs"), that can only move one space at a time, but not capture, and attempt to surround and immobilize the puma or jaguar. Pieces must move and/or capture following the pattern on the board. The expanded Alquerque board consist of an Alquerque board and a triangular patterned board attached on one of its side.

There are different triangular patterned board designs attached to the Alquerque board, and therefore Komikan has several variants. The standard triangular board (with one horizontal line across the breadth of the triangle, and one vertical line along the length of the triangle) described by Stewart Culin in 1898 (as Solitario) is only one of them. In 1918-19, Matus Z. described a Komikan board with a triangular board with two horizontal lines across its breadth, a single vertical line along its length, and two shorter vertical lines where the shorter horizontal line (the one closest to the Alquerque board) intersects with the triangle's two sides. Another board described in 1980 by J. Alcina Franch described a Taptana board with a heart-shaped triangular board with a curve line connecting to a little circle that touches the Alquerque board. This board was found at Chinchero, Peru near the capitol, Cuzco, scratched on a Pre-Hispanic wall. This board has been used as an argument that Komikan or Taptana is a Pre-Hispanic or Pre-Columbian indigenous game of South America. The last Inca emperor Atahualpa is shown on an illustration to play taptana in the Cajamarca jail with his Spanish guard (from Waman Puma de Ayala in his book written in 1615 pgs. 388, 390) before his death in 1533. The Taptana board, however, is missing a triangular board attached to it, and therefore, it looks to be a standard Alquerque board. Whether or not Komikan or Taptana is indigenous to South America, all other sources so far are after Columbus' discovery of the Americas.

Another early description of the Mapuche (Araucanian) game was described by J. I. Molina in 1787. It described that the sheep or goats step forward. The puma or jaguar was allowed to make multiple short leaps in capturing the sheep or goats.

== Related games ==
- Rimau
- Rimau-rimau
- Bagha-chall
- Aadu puli attam
- Main tapal empat
