= Main tapal empat =

Main tapal empat is a two-player abstract strategy board game from Malaysia. It is a hunt game, and specifically a tiger hunt game (or tiger game) since it uses an Alquerque board. The tigers can move as many spaces in a straight line as a clear path allows. Most hunt games have tigers, leopards, or foxes moving only one space at a time. In effect, the tigers in this game have the movement capability of the queen in chess.

== Setup ==
The game uses a standard alquerque board. Two tigers and eighteen goats are represented by distinguishable pieces, usually black and white respectively.

Players decide who will play the tigers and the goats.

The board is empty in the beginning.

== Rules ==
- Players alternate their turns throughout the game.
- The two tigers are placed on any two intersection points on the central square of the alquerque board.
- Goats are then dropped on the board one piece per turn on any vacant intersection point on the board.
- The goats on the board cannot move until all 18 of their pieces are dropped on the board which requires 18 turns. The tigers however can move and capture goat pieces from the beginning.
- Tigers move or capture exclusively in a turn following the pattern on the board.
  - Tigers can move (in any available direction) as far as they want on a straight line as long as the path is unoccupied onto a vacant intersection point. Only one tiger may be moved in a turn.
  - Alternatively, the tiger can capture a goat. Tigers can capture by the short leap as in draughts and alquerque. The leap can only be done if the tiger is already adjacent to the goat at the beginning of its turn. The tiger cannot move (next to a goat) and then leap. Nor can it leap over an adjacent goat, and then move. The tiger must either move or leap exclusively on its turn. To perform the short leap method the tiger leaps over the adjacent goat, and lands on a vacant intersection point adjacently behind the goat that was leaped over. The leap must follow the pattern on the board, and it must be done in a straight line. Only one goat may be captured in a turn, and is removed from the board. Captures are not compulsory.
- Goats move following the pattern on the board. Only one goat may be moved per turn. A goat moves (in any available direction) along a marked line onto a vacant adjacent intersection point.
- The goats win if they block the movements of the tigers such that the tigers cannot perform a legal move or capture.
- The tigers win if they capture enough of the goats so that the goats cannot effectively block the movements of the tigers, and this is usually when the number of goats are reduced to 10.

== Related games ==
- Rimau
- Rimau-rimau
- Bagha-chall
- Bagh bandi
- Sher-bakar
- Adugo
- Komikan
- Catch the hare
- Buga-shadara
