= Adugo =

Board game

- Starting positions for the board game adugo
- Other names: Jogo da Onça
- Genres: Abstract strategy game Board game
- Players: 2

Adugo, also known as Jogo da Onça (Brazilian Portuguese pronunciation: ['ʒogo da ˈõ.sɐ], lit. 'Jaguar Game') is a two-player abstract strategy game from the Bororo tribe in the Pantanal region of Brazil.

It is a hunting game similar to those in Southeast Asia and the Indian subcontinent. It is especially similar to komikan, rimau, rimau-rimau, main tapal empat, and bagha-chall as they all use an alquerque-based board. Adugo is specifically a tiger hunt game (or tiger game). Komikan may be the same game as adugo. Komikan is the name given by the Mapuches in Chile.

In adugo, the jaguar ("adugo", in Bororo's language) is hunting the dogs ("arikau"). The game is also known as jaguar and dogs.

It is thought that the Spanish brought alquerque to the Americas, and this accounts for the use of the alquerque board in this game.

== Equipment ==
The board used is an expanded alquerque board with one triangular patterned board on one of its sides. There is only one jaguar and 14 dogs. The jaguar is colored black, and the 14 dogs are colored white or brown. However, any two colors or distinguishable pieces are appropriate. The board was initially drawn on the ground with stones as pieces.

== Rules and game play ==
In the beginning, the jaguar is on the central point of the alquerque board. All the dogs are on one half of the alquerque board that is opposite that of the triangular patterned board.

Players decide which animal to play with. The jaguar moves first. Players alternate their turns. Only one piece is used for movement or capture per turn.

The jaguar and dogs move one space at a time per turn following the pattern on the board.

The jaguar can capture by the short leap as in draughts or alquerque. The jaguar leaps over an adjacent dog and lands on the other side in a straight line, following the pattern on the board. The dogs can not capture, only corner the jaguar.

The game ends with the dogs as winners if the jaguar can no longer move while the jaguar wins by capturing 5 dogs.
