= Lambs and tigers =

South Indian leopard hunt game

Lambs and tigers game
- Three variations of empty grids on which this game can be played
- Genres: Board game Leopard hunt game
- Players: 2
- Setup time: < 1 min
- Playing time: < 1 hour
- Chance: None
- Skills: Strategy
- Synonyms: Pulijudam or Puli meka aata (Telugu), Aadu puli aatam (Tamil), Huli Katti or Aadu Huli Aata (Kannada)

The lambs and tigers game, locally referred as the game of goats and tigers (Telugu: Puli-mē̃ka āṭa, Tamil: Āḍu-puli āṭṭam, Kannada: Āḍu-huli āṭa), is a strategic, two-player (or 2 teams) leopard hunt game that is played in south India. The game is asymmetric in that one player controls three tigers and the other player controls up to 15 lambs/goats. The tigers 'hunt' the goats while the goats attempt to block the tigers' movements.

== Background ==
- This is the ancient game played in the southern part of India, especially in Karnataka, Tamil Nadu and the Telugu states.
- The board is drawn on the parapet inside the mahadwara of the Chamundeshwari temple atop Chamundi Betta (hill) in Mysore, Karnataka
- This game helps people to develop strategy and the concept of teamwork by teaching that even though weak, if united, one can vanquish the stronger enemy as a team.
- This game is very similar to the Nepali game of bagh-chal.

== Names ==
- పులిమేఁకాట [pulimē̃kāṭa] (the tiger and goat game) / పులిజూదము [pulijūdamu] (tiger gambling) – Telugu
- ஆடு புலி ஆட்டம் [āḍu puli āṭṭam] (the goat and tiger game) – Tamil
- ಹುಲಿಘಟ್ಟ [hulighaṭṭa] (tiger game) / ಆಡು-ಹುಲಿ [āḍu-huli] (goat-tiger) / ಹುಲಿ ಕಟ್ಟಿ [huli kaṭṭi] (encage the tiger) – Kannada

== See also ==
- Bagh-chal

== Gallery ==
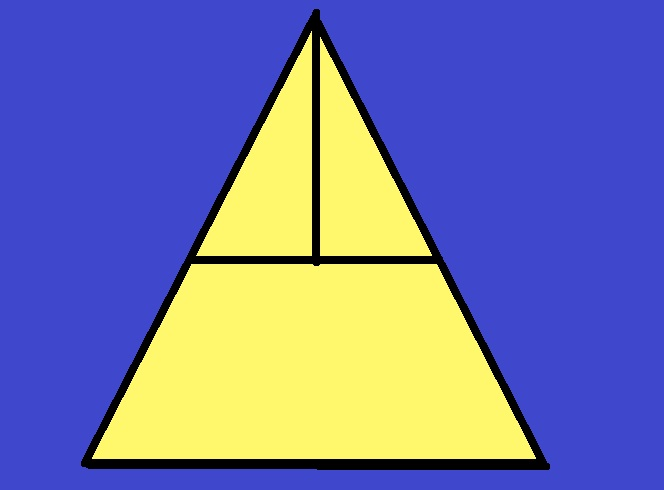
Game type -1

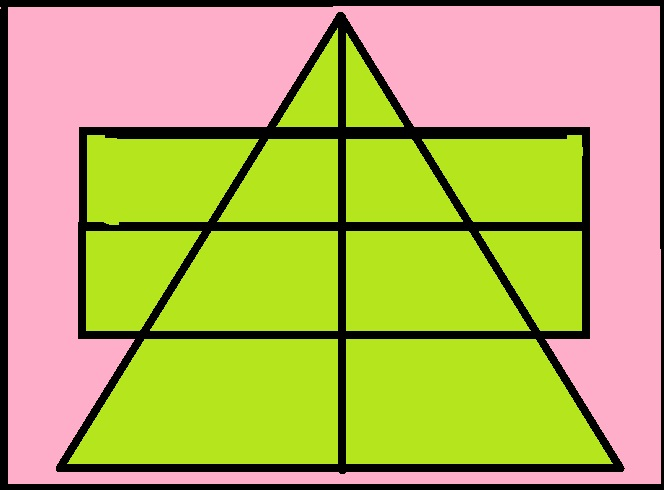
Game type -2

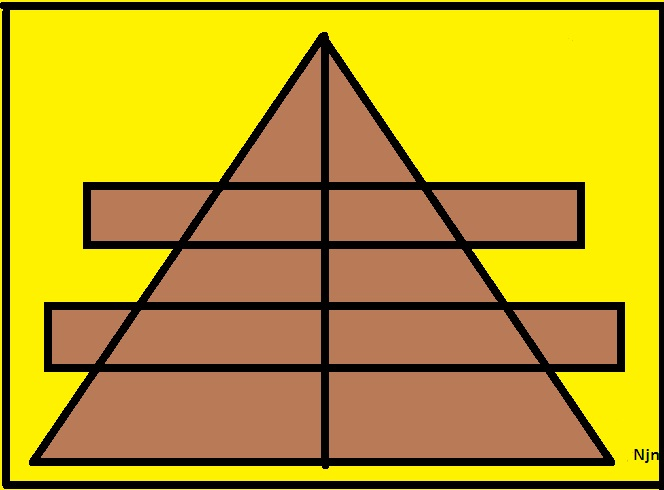
Game type -3
