= Fox games =

Type of two player board game

Fox games are a category of asymmetric board games for two players, where one player (the fox) attempts to catch the opponent's pieces (typically geese or sheep), while that player moves their pieces to either trap the fox or reach a destination on the board. In one variant, fox and hounds, a single fox tries to evade the other player's hounds.

The game is known by many names around the world, including Fox and geese in Britain, Renard et les poules in France, Lupo e pecore in Italy, Fuchs und Gänse (or Fuchs und Henne) in Germany, Schaap en wolf in the Netherlands, riebantablu in Sápmi, Rävspel in Sweden, Refskák in Iceland, Ratón y gatos in Spain, Lis i gęsi in Poland, Vlci a ovce in Slovakia, Volk i ovtsy in Russia and Bagh-chal in Nepal.

== History ==
The game Halatafl is known from at least as early as the 14th century, and it is mentioned in Grettis saga. It probably originated in Scandinavia, as a variant of Tafl. In fact, Halatafl is still played in Scandinavia with rules similar to Tafl; see below. Edward IV of England is known to have purchased two foxes and 26 hounds to form two sets of Marelles, believed to be Fox and Hounds. As Fox and Geese, the game was a favorite pastime of Queen Victoria.

== Halatafl ==
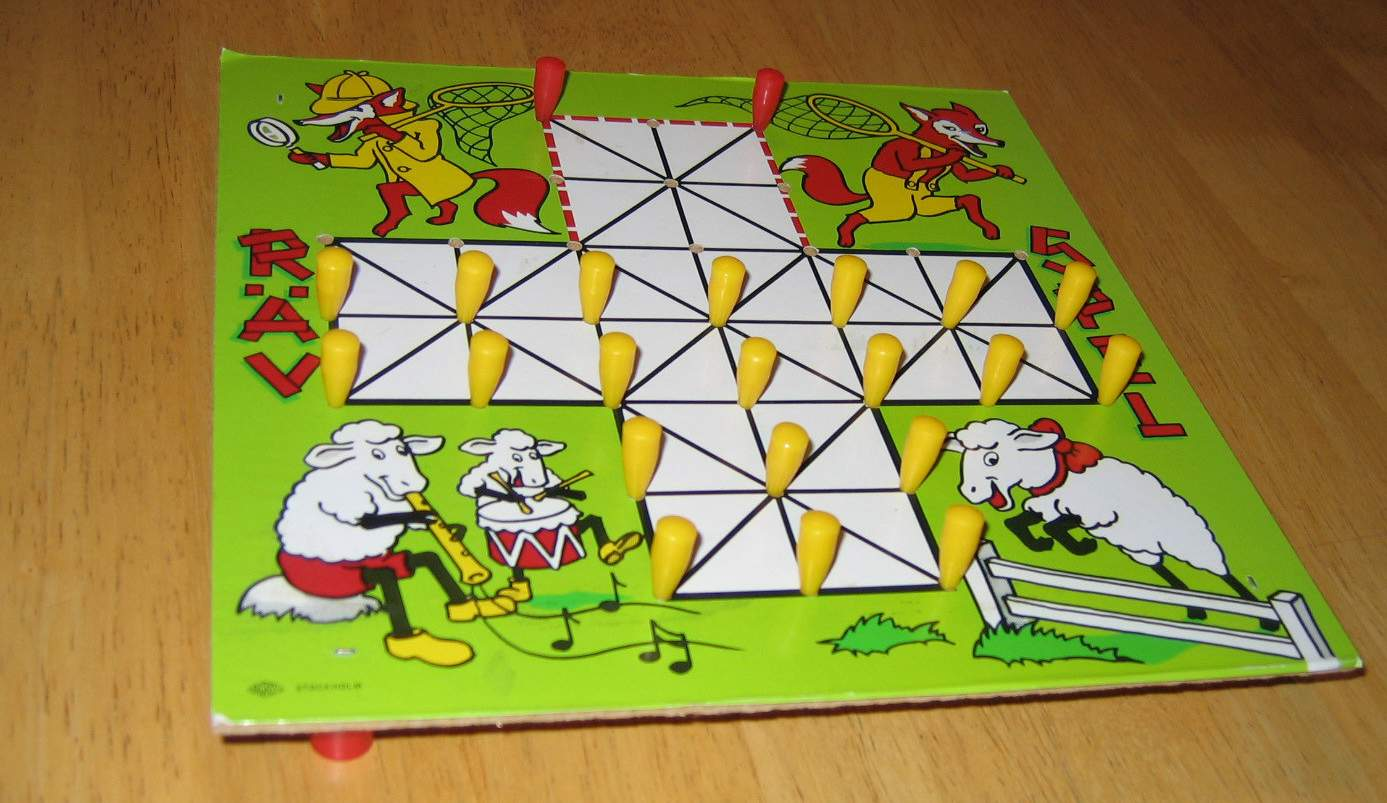
A modern edition of the traditional Scandinavian halatafl, the "fox game"

Halatafl means "tail board", in Old Norse, and "tail" presumably refers to a fox's tail. As in Grettis saga, rävspelet (modern Swedish for "the Fox game") is still played with holes and pegs.

There are two fox pegs (the red pegs on the picture) and 20 sheep pegs (the yellow pegs). Like the original game, tafl, the objective is for the defender (sheep) to reach a certain destination on the board, the square of nine holes marked with red, and it is the attacker's (the foxes) objective to stop the defender from reaching it. The foxes are placed in the corners on the bottom of the red square (the paddock), whereas the sheep are placed on the opposite side of the board. When the players have decided who will move first, they move one step in turns. The sheep may only move forward or sideways, while the foxes may move in any direction, even backwards. If a sheep is in front of an empty hole, the fox has to jump over and capture the sheep, as in checkers. The capturing is mandatory, as are repeated jumps if possible. The sheep have won if they manage to fill the paddock, the red square.

== Fox and geese ==
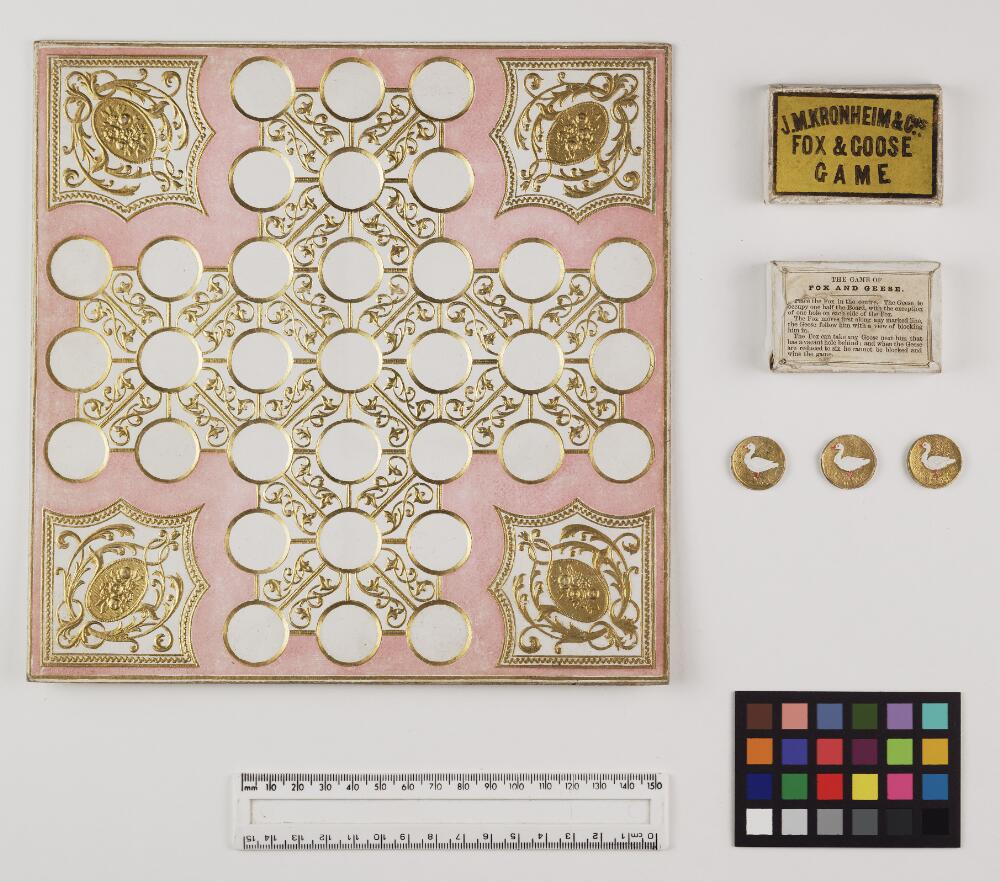
1840s British "Fox & Goose" game

In the English-speaking world a simplified version is known as Fox and Geese. In this version the objective of reaching a certain location has been removed and instead it all comes down to capturing each other's pieces. It is not mandatory for the fox to capture the opponent's pieces, and there are no restraints on the defender's (the geese's) movements.

The fox is placed in the middle of the board, and 13 geese are placed on one side of the board. The fox and geese can move to any empty space around them (also diagonally). The fox can jump over geese like in checkers, capturing them. Repeated jumps are possible. Geese can not jump. Unlike in Halatafl, capturing is not mandatory. The geese win if they surround the fox so that it cannot move. The fox wins if it captures enough geese so that the remaining geese cannot surround it.

The traditional game with 13 geese is not well balanced and gives the advantage to the fox. There are more balanced game variants with 15, 17 or 18 geese or two foxes.

Fox and geese is an example of a loopy game.

== Fox and hounds ==
	1		2		3		4
5		6		7		8
	9		10		11		12
13		14		15		16
	17		18		19		20
21		22		23		24
	25		26		27		28
29		30		31		32

Fox and hounds

This version (also called "wolf and sheep", "hounds and hare", or "devil and tailors") is played on an 8×8 chessboard. As in draughts, only the dark squares are used. The four hounds are initially placed on the dark squares at one edge of the board; the fox is placed on any dark square on the opposite edge. The objective of the fox is to cross from one side of the board to the other, arriving at any one of the hounds' original squares; the hounds' objective is to prevent it from doing so.

The hounds move like a draughts man, diagonally forward one square. The fox moves like a draughts king, diagonally forward or backward one square. However, there is no jumping, promotion, or removal of pieces. The play alternates with the fox moving first. The player controlling the hounds may move only one of them each turn.

The fox is trapped when it can no longer move to a vacant square. It is possible for two hounds to trap the fox against an edge of the board (other than their original home-row) or even one corner (see diagram) where a single hound may do the trapping. Should a hound reach the fox's original home row it will be unable to move further.

Perfect play will result in a "hounds" victory, even if the fox is allowed to choose any starting square and to pass his turn once during the game, as demonstrated in Winning Ways.

Koti keliya or the leopard game is a similar blockade game to fox and hounds, and was played in Sri Lanka. The game was documented by Henry Parker in Ancient Ceylon: An Account of the Aborigines and of Part of the Early Civilisation (1909). A 12 square x 12 square checkered board is used (144 squares in total), and Parker specifically mentions the checkered board to be red (or black) and white. One player plays the leopard which is represented by one piece, and six other pieces represents either cattle or dogs which is played by the other player. The cattle (or dogs) are initially placed on one side (its first rank) of the board, and on the white squares. The leopard may be placed on any vacant white square. Both leopard and cattle move in the diagonal direction only. The cattle are further restricted in their movements because they may only move one space in the forward diagonal direction in a turn onto a vacant square. The leopard may move in any diagonal direction one or two spaces in a turn provided the spaces are vacant. The objective of the cattle is to trap the leopard blocking its movements, whereas the leopard attempts to pass the cattle thus preventing the cattle from ever fulfilling their objective. There is no capturing in this game. Parker mentions that the game is not played in the interior villages of Sri Lanka.

== See also ==
- Asalto
- Peg solitaire - played on the same board and originating as a variant of the Fox games.
- Tafl games
