= Bagh-chal =

Two-player board game from Nepal

- Bagh-chal gameboard
- Players: 2
- Setup time: < 1 min
- Playing time: < 1 hour
- Chance: None
- Skills: Strategy

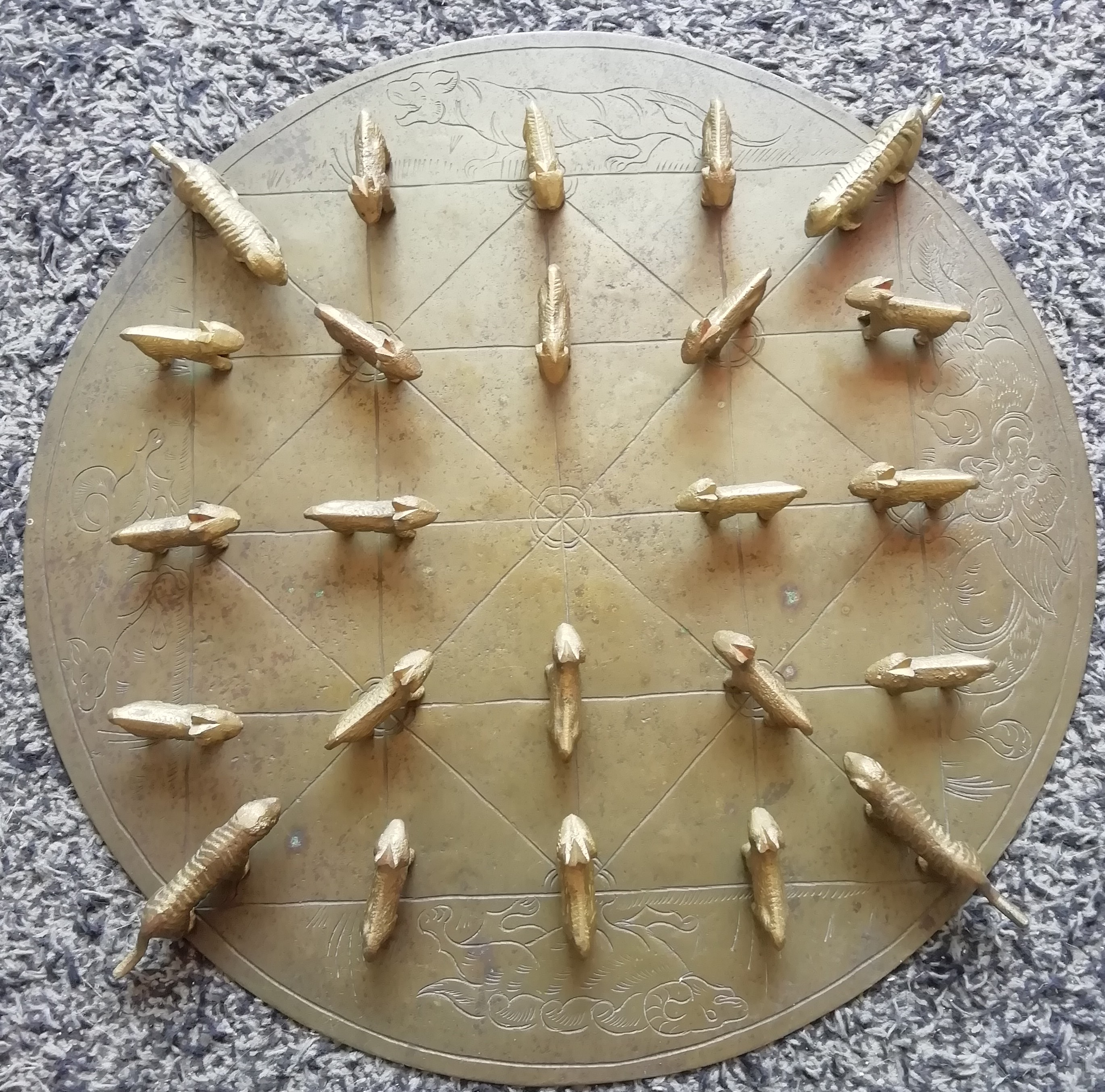
Brass playing board and tokens

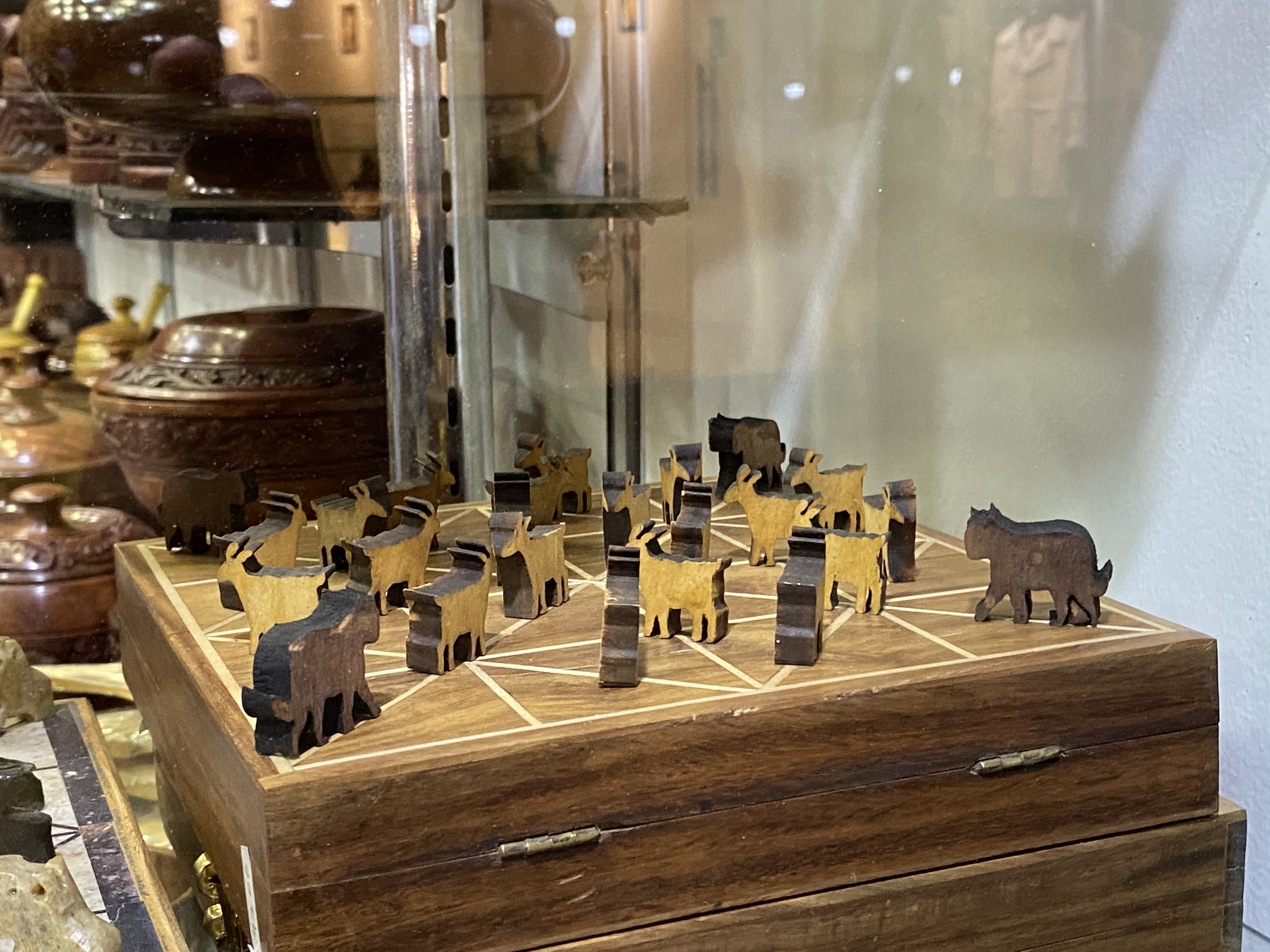
Bagh-chal table

Bagh-chal (Nepali: बाघ चाल bāgh cāl, Newar: धुँ कासा dhun kasa meaning "tiger game") is a strategic, two-player board game that originated in Nepal. The game is asymmetric in that one player controls four tigers and the other player controls up to twenty goats. The tigers 'hunt' the goats while the goats attempt to block the tigers' movements. This game is also seen in southern India with a different board, but the rules are the same. This game is popular in rural areas of the country.

== Overview ==
The game is played on a 5×5 point grid, like alquerque. Pieces are positioned at the intersection of the lines and not inside the areas delimited by them. Directions of valid movement between these points are connected by lines. The game play takes place in two phases. In the first phase the goats are placed on the board while the tigers are moved. In the second phase both the goats and the tigers are moved. For the tigers, the objective is to "capture" five goats to win. Capturing is performed as in alquerque and draughts, by jumping over the goats, although capturing is not obligatory. The goats win by blocking all the tigers' legal moves. Bagh-chal has many similarities to the Indian game aadu puli attam (lambs and tigers game), though the board is different.

== Rules ==
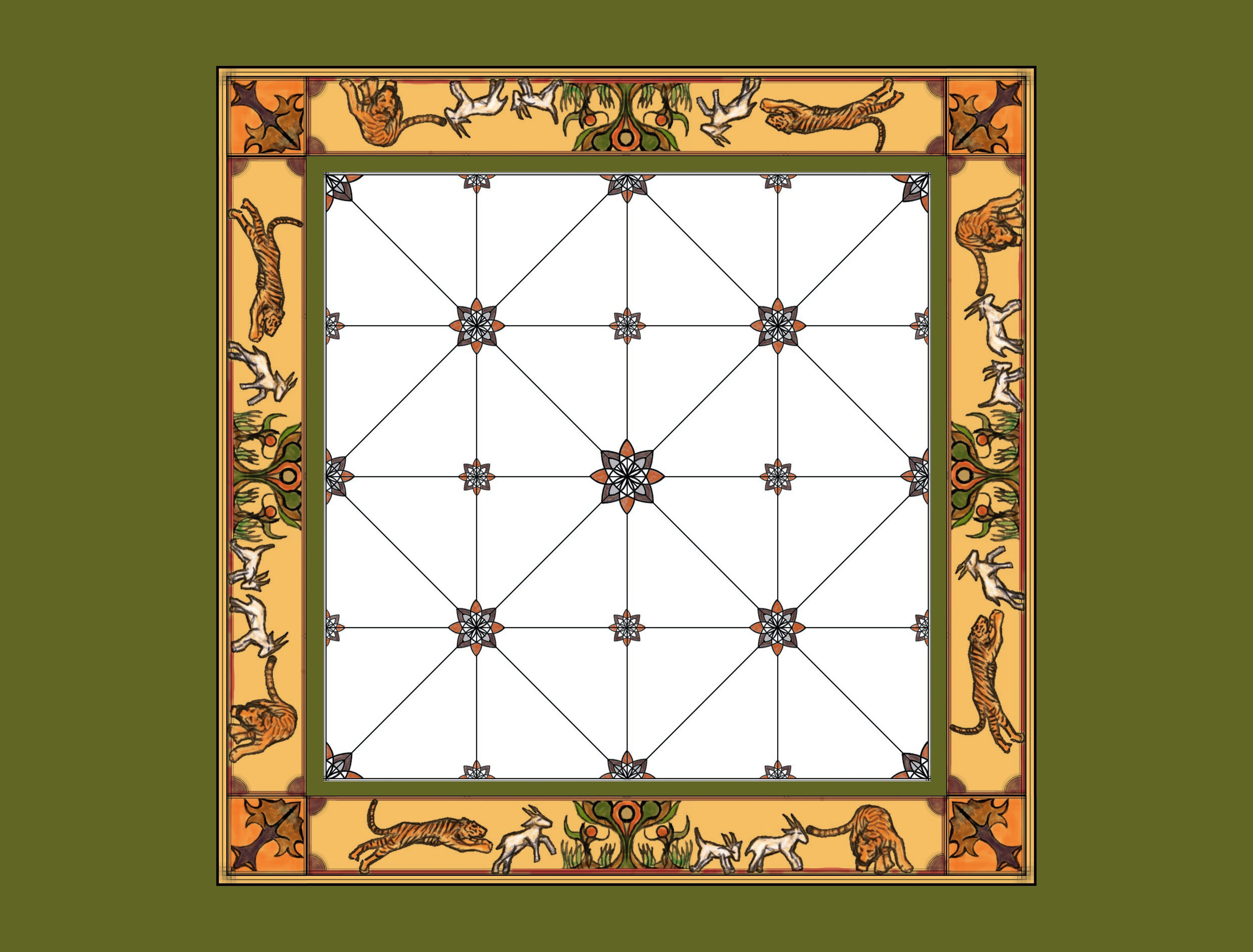
Decorative gameboards often reflect the story of the game using ancient traditional Asian patterns.

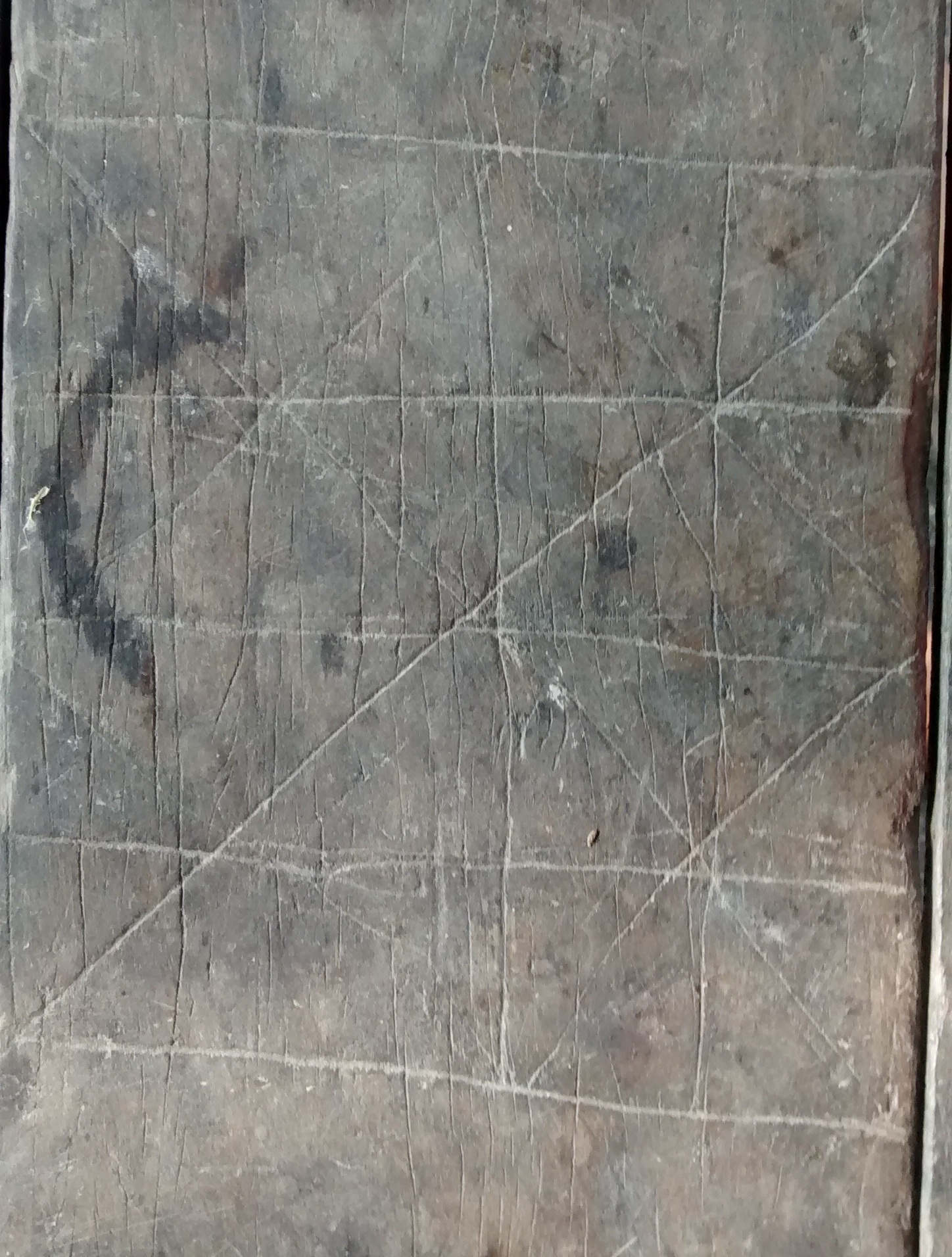
Bagh-chal lines

At the start of the game all four tigers are placed on the four corners of the grid, facing the center. No goats are placed on the board during the initial setup.

The player controlling the goats moves first, by placing a goat onto a free intersection on the board. Tigers may move along the lines from one intersection to another. Once all of the goats have been placed on the board, goats must move in the same fashion as the tigers, one intersection to another. Moves alternate between players.

Tigers capture goats by jumping over them to an adjacent free position (as in checkers, although capturing is not obligatory in Bagh-chal).

Rules for tigers:

- They can move to an adjacent free position along the lines.
- They can capture goats during any move, and do not need to wait until all goats are placed.
- They can capture only one goat at a time.
- They can jump over a goat in any direction, as long as there is an open space for the tiger to complete its turn.
- A tiger cannot jump over another tiger.

The goats must move according to these rules:

- Goats cannot move until all goats have been positioned on the board.
- They must leave the board when captured.
- They cannot jump over tigers or other goats.

The game is over when either the tigers capture five goats or the goats have blocked the tigers from being able to move.

Sometimes the game can fall into a repetitive cycle of positions. Goats especially may use this resort to defend themselves against being captured. To avoid this situation, an additional rule has been established: when all the goats have been placed, no move may return the board to a situation that has already occurred during the game. For instance in the following position the goat-player can not move forever in the upper right edge while tiger-player may continuously play the middle bottom edge tiger waiting for a goat to sacrifice itself.

== See also ==
- Lambs and tigers
