= Palago =

Artistic puzzle game

- Palago tiles
- Players: 1-5
- Setup time: 1 minute
- Playing time: 30 minutes
- Chance: Medium
- Age range: 6+
- Skills: Strategy, Artistic flair

Palago is a creative art puzzle/game designed by Cameron Browne. A Palago set contains 48 identical regular hexagonal tiles which can be used for a series of puzzles, a strategic two-player game and a co-operative multi-player game called Palagonia which was co-designed with Mike McManaway, the inventor of Tantrix.

== History ==
Mambo tiles

Red-dominant side

Blue-dominant side

Cameron Browne, an Australian mathematician and author of two books on game theory, created the tile design and the two player version (originally called Mambo) in 2007. The hexagonal tiles of Mambo are double-sided, with each side having three colors: red, white, and blue. One side is described as blue-dominant, and has a blue bridge-shaped region and a red wedge-shaped region. The other side is described as red-dominant, and has the opposite pattern. The patterns are formed by considering the borders of regions formed by paths linking two sides each: one pair of opposite sides are linked by a straight line, and the other four sides are linked by a circular arc linking adjacent sides. This is the same side-linking arrangement as a serpentile (Van Ness notation 102), one of the hexagonal edge-matching puzzle tiles used in games such as Psyche-paths, Kaliko, and Tantrix.

Palago tile

Serpentile 102

The tiles were simplified to two colors and the name was changed to Lite Mambo or Lambo, then Palago, due to the resemblance of the tiles to the island of Palau and some strategic similarities to the game of Go. Browne proposed the concept of "Palagonia" to describe the many possible creature-like shapes that can be made with the tiles, several of which have been rendered as "Palagonian Puzzle Creatures" by Franco Giuliani, an Argentinian artist. The multiplayer version - also called Palagonia - was designed by McManaway and Browne in 2009, and uses all 48 tiles plus two specially designed "Palago" dice.

"Palaglyph", one of several patterns possible using Palago tiles

== Gameplay ==
=== Mambo ===
By examination, each hexagonal Mambo tile has three colored corners and three white corners, with each colored corner separated by a white corner; the red-dominant side has two red and one blue corners, while the blue-dominant side has two blue and one red corners.

Gameplay in Mambo is similar to the connection games Trax and the Black Path Game: players take turns placing a single tile per turn; each new tile must be placed adjacent to an existing tile and must continue the colors across the adjacent tile edges. Players are not restricted to playing tiles in their dominant color (i.e., the Blue player can play either the blue-dominant side or the red-dominant side in any legal orientation). Like Trax, Mambo has a forced-move rule: a space bordered by three tiles prescribes the colors of each corner precisely. When such a space bordered by three adjacent tiles has prescribed a mix of colors (blue and red), a tile is played to automatically fill the space; this auto-move is not considered part of a player's turn. On the other hand, if the space has three corners prescribed to be the same color by the adjacent tiles, it is not possible to play a tile there and the space is considered a null point. Note that when two corners are specified to be the same color, there is only one possible tile that can be played in this known point.

With two of the same color corners specified in the empty space bordered by three adjacent tiles, this known point can only have one red-dominant tile/orientation as a legal play. However, since there is no requirement to play into this space, it is not an auto-move.

With three of the same color corners specified in the empty space bordered by four adjacent tiles, this null point has no legal move and is marked-out with an X.

With three of the corners specified with a mix of colors, this auto-move requires a specific red-dominant tile to be played.

The auto-move has been applied with the only legal tile placement.

The objective of Mambo is to "kill" the opponent's group(s) by preventing further growth, either by closing off the opponent's group or by blocking it with a null point.

Winning condition for Red, blocking the Blue groups with a null point

Winning condition for Blue, closing the Red group.

In some cases, the territory score is computed instead. The territory enclosed by a loop is scored according to the number of junctions within it, where three corners meet and have the same color.

=== Palago ===
Both Palago and Palagonia can be played on any flat surface. To start Palago, each player chooses a colour and then draws a tile out of the bag to see who goes first (though having no significance in play, half the tiles have the colour of one player on the back and half have the colour of the other player).

The first player places two tiles in the middle with both colours matching. Play continues with each player always placing two tiles per turn, and obeying the basic rules.

Basic Rules:

1. At least one of the two tiles must connect to the palago (the tiles already played).
2. The two tiles being played must touch each other.
3. All touching edge colours must match.

To win:

- The first player with a closed creature using more than three tiles of their colour is the winner.
- The creature must be closed on the inside too.
- Only one tile needs to be played, if that tile results in a win for either player.
- A player loses if they close creatures of both colours on the same move.

Palago can be played with any number of tiles. The game is drawn if the tiles run out before either player wins, (although with 48 tiles this is unlikely).

Palago is balanced between attacking and defending strategies. In fact, early in the game it can be wiser to defend without counter-attacking. This is because a player's overall position deteriorates with each attack while defending often seems to improve it. Then, when the timing is right, players should go on the attack and try to convert their superior position into a win.

Sample game (June 23, 2009; AI "Dumbot" [white] vs. Mike McManaway [blue])
| Turn | White (Dumbot) | Board | Blue (M. McManaway) |
|---|---|---|---|
| 1 | Opening move | | |
| 2 | | | Attacks to create immediate threat of winning position with next move (shown with dotted line) |
| 3 | Defends by removing immediate threat; sets up potential threat | | |
| 4 | | | Ignores potential threat and creates new immediate threat |
| 5 | Again defends by removing immediate threat; sets up potential threat | | |
| 6 | | | Ignores potential threat and creates new immediate threat |
| 7 | Again defends by removing immediate threat; sets up potential threat. Multiple potential threats are active now. | | |
| 8 | | | Ignores potential threat and creates new immediate threat |
| 9 | Again defends by removing immediate threat; sets up immediate threat. | | |
| 10 | | | Defends by ensuring that White cannot close the group without also closing a Blue group; creates new immediate threat. |
| 11 | Defends by ensuring that Blue cannot close the group without also closing a White group; creates new immediate threat. | | |
| 12 | | | New immediate threat created (White's immediate threat not addressed) |
| 13 | Completes group in middle of board to win | | |

=== Palagonia ===
All players each roll one die to begin. Palagonia uses a single custom six-sided die; the 2, 3, 4, and 5 are standard and action symbols take the place of the 1 and the 6. The player with the highest actual number (2, 3, 4, or 5) starts the game by taking exactly that number of tiles and connecting them together in any way (with colours matching). If nobody rolls a number, then all players roll again. Play then continues in a clockwise direction.

Alternatively, a regular six-sided die can be used. A turn consists of the player rolling the die and following the required action:

- If a 1 is rolled, the action is remove an exterior tile, i.e., a tile with at least one free adjacent edge
- If a 6 is rolled, the action is rotate an interior tile, i.e., a tile that is completely surrounded by other tiles
- If any other number is rolled, the action is to add that number of tiles; all added tiles must touch each other

Rules when playing with two dice:

1. Roll both dice and choose one to obey.
2. If a player rolls doubles they get an extra turn.
3. When one die action cannot be carried out, the other must be followed. If neither die action is possible, the player must remove an external tile.
4. When closing a creature, all tiles-to-be-played must form part of that creature or it does not score.

Objective

Players score points by forming creatures. Larger ones are usually worth more, depending on their shape. The best way to close a high scoring creature is to team up with one of your neighbours (either the player just before you or just after you), because points are usually given to both players who contribute. The game ends when all the tiles have been used.

== Additional information ==
Palago was officially launched at the 2010 Nuremberg International Toy and Game Fair and is currently available in these countries: New Zealand, Australia, Germany, Taiwan, Poland, Hungary, Croatia, Russia and Greece. It was chosen as one of the fair's top ten iconic images.

In September 2010, Palago won the New Zealand 'New Game of the Year' award.
