= Crosstrack =

Abstract strategy game

- Game box
- Players: 2-4
- Setup time: 30 seconds
- Playing time: 10-30 minutes
- Chance: None
- Age range: 8+
- Skills: Tactics, Strategy

Crosstrack, billed as the "unique track switching game", is an abstract strategy game designed by Philip Shoptaugh and first published in 1994. Players place special track pieces onto an irregular octagon board, winning by being the first to create an unbroken path between two opposite sides. It is an example of a tile-based edge-matching path connection game, similar to the Black Path Game, Trax, and Tsuro (which use four-sided square tiles), Tantrix and Kaliko (hexagonal tiles), and Octiles (octagonal tiles).

== Equipment ==
Crosstrack board (standard 52-cell)

A patent granted to Philip L. Shoptaugh and describes a board game played with octagonal and square interstitial tiles bearing angular paths.

The game, as first published in 1994 by Discovery Toys, is played on an octagonal board with 52 octagonal cells and 45 square interstitial spaces, arranged in a 4×3 configuration, with four paths leading inward along each of the 4-cell sides. There are 32 octagonal pathway pieces and 16 square intersection pieces with raised tracks; the 32 octagonal pathway pieces are divided evenly into 4 color sets, each with 8 pathway pieces, and the 16 square intersection pieces are a single color (black). Each of the eight octagonal pathway pieces in a color set have unique patterns, and each of the four color sets have the same set of eight patterns. Four of the octagonal pathway pieces in each set have two paths linking three or four sides, and the other four have three paths linking five or six sides. The square intersection pieces are divided evenly into four each of straight, crossed, tee, and elbow paths.

Crosstrack game pieces
Sides	Paths	Sides linked				
Sides	Paths	2	3	4	5	6
8 pathway	2					
8 pathway	3					
4 intersection	1					
4 intersection	2					

Crosstrack Challenge uses a smaller 4×2 octagonal board with 32 octagonal cells and prepopulated interstitial squares.

A travel variant named Crosstrack Challenge was released in 1996 with a smaller 4×2 octagonal board and 32 octagonal cells. Unlike the regular variant, Challenge has the 25 interstitial square cells prepopulated with connectors and there are no intersection pieces. There are 24 octagonal pathway pieces supplied, in 4 sets of 6. Like the larger (1994) Crosstrack, within each color set there are six unique patterns; each color set has the same six unique patterns, that is, there are four pathway pieces with a given path/track pattern, one in each set color. Three of the eight octagonal pathway pieces from Crosstrack (1994) have been removed, leaving five of the six pieces the same as the larger game; one pathway piece with two straight, crossed paths has been added:

Crosstrack Challenge game pieces
Sides	Paths	Sides linked			
Sides	Paths	3	4	5	6
8 pathway	2				
8 pathway	3				

In 1999, the license for Crosstrack reverted to Philip Shoptaugh, who re-released the two versions, renaming Crosstrack Challenge to Crosstrack (standard size) and the larger 1994 version to Crosstrack (tournament size) or Large Crosstrack. Colors of pieces and boards vary depending on the publisher; the large board is approximately 14 in (360 mm) between opposite sides, while the small board is approximately 9 in (230 mm).

Crosstrack versions
Year	Publisher	Name	Board cells	Colors			
Year	Publisher	Name	Board cells	Board	Pathway pieces	Track	Intersection pieces
1994	Discovery Toys	Crosstrack	52+45	Red	Orange, Green, Blue, Violet	Yellow	Black
1996	Discovery Toys	Crosstrack Challenge	32	Aqua	Magenta, Yellow, Green, Blue	White	N/A
1999	Shoptaugh	Crosstrack (tournament)	52+45	Green	Red, Orange, Yellow, Purple	White	Green
1999	Shoptaugh	Crosstrack (standard)	32	Aqua	Magenta, Yellow, Green, Purple	White	N/A

== Rules ==
=== Setup ===
Players choose one color and take all the octagonal pathway pieces in that color as their "stock"; depending on the number of players, players may be required to choose more than one color. In the original (1994) and "tournament" (1999) versions, the square intersection pieces are left in a common pile.

Play starts with the youngest player and proceeds to the left. During the opening round of moves, each player must place one pathway piece on any open cell in the board; intersection piece placement is not allowed until each player has played one pathway piece.

=== All games ===
Example game: The player who placed the piece at [G5] can win by rotating that piece by 90° to form a continuous path from [A4] to [H5], connecting the left and right sides of the board.; Alternatively, a different player could win the game by placing an appropriate piece at [E6] to connect the path from [D1] to [E8], connecting top and bottom.; Note that both potential paths [A4—H5] and [D1—E8] consist of pathway pieces of multiple colors. The winner is the player who places, rotates, or moves a piece to complete a cross-board path.

Play begins with an empty board and the octagonal pathway pieces are distributed amongst the players as their playing stock. To win, a player must connect any two opposite sides of the board in an unbroken path, regardless of the colors of the pathway pieces used for that path.

Each player's turn consists of one of three basic moves:

1. Place an octagonal pathway piece from their own stock onto any unoccupied spot on the board.
2. Rotate a pathway piece already on the board to any chosen orientation, if they placed it there.
3. Move one of their pathway pieces already present on the board to any unoccupied space in any orientation.
4. For the original (1994) and "tournament" (1999) game, any player may place a square intersection piece during their turn, following the opening round of moves.

Once played, a pathway piece remains on the board; it may be moved or rotated by the player who placed it (or, in the team variant, by the player's teammate). During their turn, a player also is not allowed to rotate or move any piece played by an opponent. In addition, a placed piece cannot be removed or replaced with another one from the player's stock. The rotate and move are mutually exclusive: if a piece is rotated, it cannot also be moved to a different spot on the board. Likewise, if the piece is moved, it cannot also be rotated into a different orientation when placed.

In addition, once placed, intersection pieces cannot be moved or rotated. In the 1996 Challenge and subsequent 1999 "standard" versions, the intersection pieces are permanently attached to the board and this rule does not apply.

=== Two-player game ===
In a two player game, each player chooses two colors to form their stock, that is, each player receives half of the octagonal pathway pieces.

=== Three-player game ===
In a three player game, each player chooses one color to form their stock, and the last color is set aside as a common stock. Any player may play from the common stock on their turn, and rotate or move common pieces on the board. However, after a common piece is acted upon in one of these three manners, it cannot be moved or relocated during the next two turns. In other words, if player A rotates a common piece on the board, neither player B nor C will be able to move or rotate it on their immediately subsequent turns. However, once play returns to A, any player is free to rotate or relocate the piece again–unless, of course, A chooses to move or rotate the piece again.

=== Four-player game ===
The 1994 version of the game allowed up to four individual players, with each player choosing one color.

=== Four-player team game ===
Players choose one color each as well as a partner, and play as two opposing teams. Partners sit opposite each other, with play passing between teams every turn. Players are allowed to rotate or relocate a team member's piece if it is already on the board, but do not have the ability to place pieces from their partner's stock. In addition, teammates may discuss their moves prior to placing a piece; however, to increase the difficulty, it is suggested that discussion of potential moves may be banned.

== Strategy ==
Control of the "ports" at the edges of the board is important, as control or successful manipulation of these is necessary in order to establish a path across the board. Players should also be aware of the strengths and weaknesses of the different pieces.
