= Diamond (game) =

Two-player strategy board game

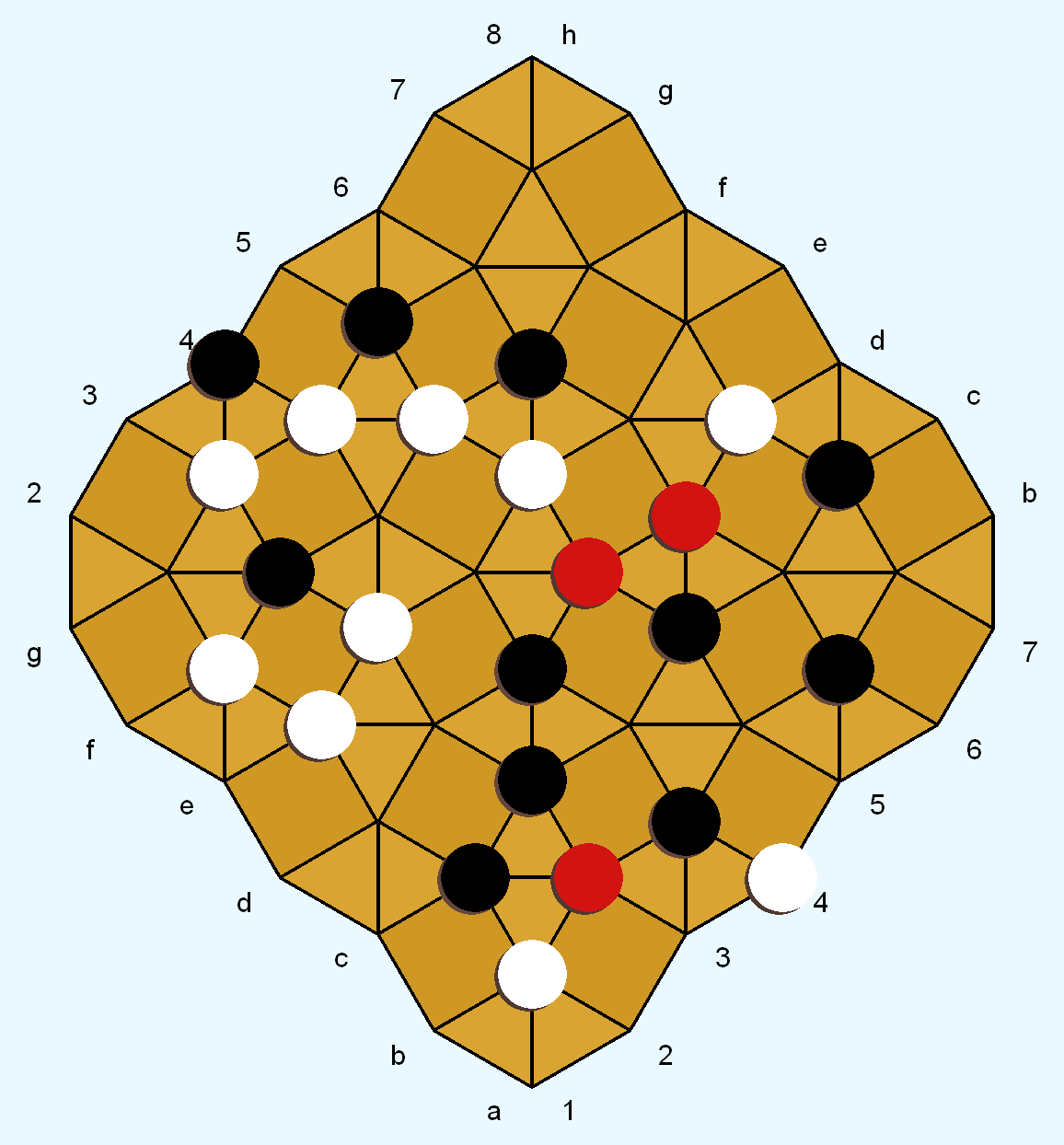
White to play has only one winning move. Solution: 1. e3-e4! White cannot stop Black from occupying points b5 and c6, completing a square in two moves, so White must play 1.e3-e4! forcing 1...f3-f4. Then White must play 2.g3-f3 forcing 2...f4-e3. Then White wins with 3.f3-f4 or 3.g4-f4.

Diamond is a two-player abstract strategy board game invented by Larry Back. The invention was inspired by the game Kensington, which uses a similar board pattern and game objective. Rules for Diamond were conceived in 1985 and finalized in 1994. Diamond introduces a new board geometry and neutral pieces, with the aim of enhancing the game dynamic and lowering the potential for draws.

Diamond was featured in the February 2013 issue of Games magazine.

== Overview ==
The Diamond gameboard consists of interlocking squares and triangles. White and Black each control 12 game pieces of their own color. Neutral pieces (red-colored in the diagrams) enter the game via captures. The pieces are played on the line intersections (called points, as in Go). White and black (but not red) pieces can move along straight lines to adjacent unoccupied points. A player wins by being the first to occupy all four corners (points) of a board square with their pieces.

== Game rules ==
The game begins with an empty Diamond board. Black moves first, then turns alternate. (To offset any advantage Black has in moving first, the pie rule is used: White can choose to switch sides after Black's first move, playing from then on as Black. White has this option only after Black's first move.) Passing a turn is not permitted.

The game is executed in two phases:

1. Placement phase. Players take turns placing one of their pieces on any open point on the board. No placements result in a capture in this phase. A player can win the game in this phase if they are able to occupy all four corners of a board square; otherwise, play proceeds to the Movement phase once all 24 pieces have been placed.
2. Movement phase. For their turn, a player may either:
  - move one of their pieces along a straight line to an adjacent empty point; or,
  - remove a neutral piece from the board—but only if no white or black piece is adjacent to it.

=== Captures and neutral pieces ===
Capturing moves are possible in the Movement phase. If the points of a triangle contain exactly one white and one black piece, either player can capture the opponent piece by occupying the remaining open point ("cornering" the enemy piece on the triangle). The captured piece can be cornered on one triangle (see Example 1), or simultaneously cornered on two different triangles (Example 4). The captured piece is immediately removed from the game and replaced on its point by a neutral piece.

If a move simultaneously corners two opponent pieces on two different triangles, then neither enemy piece is captured (Examples 2 and 3). A piece can move safely to a triangle point even if the other two points of the triangle are occupied by enemy pieces (Example 5).

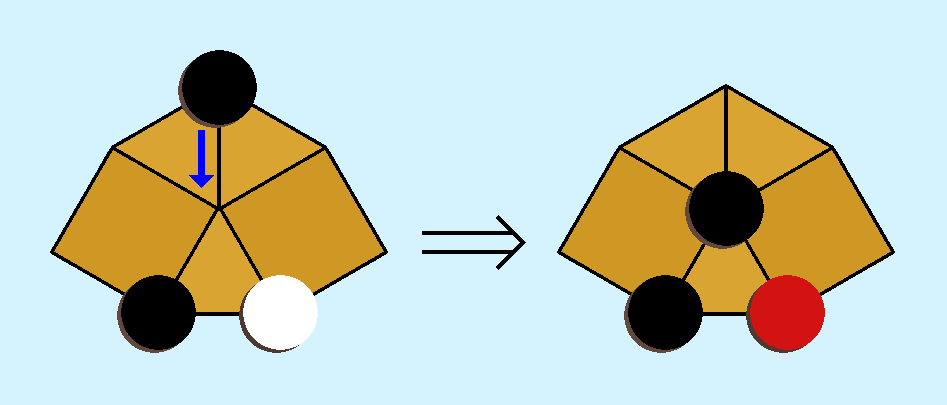
Example 1: Cornering one (capture)

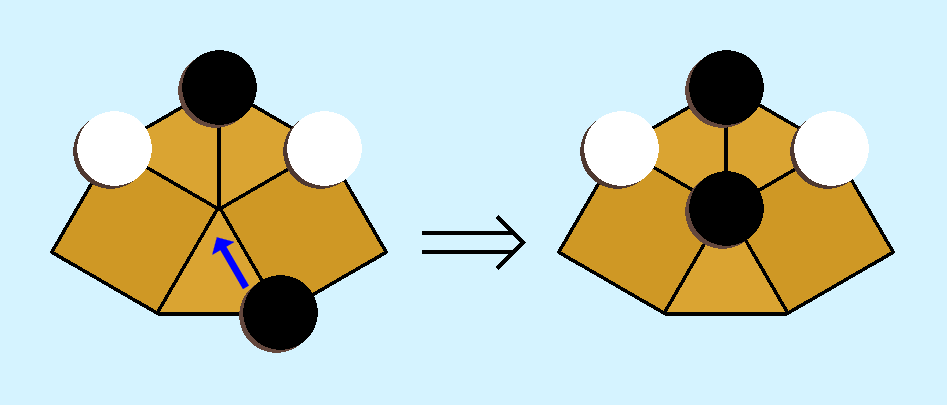
Example 2: Cornering two (no capture)

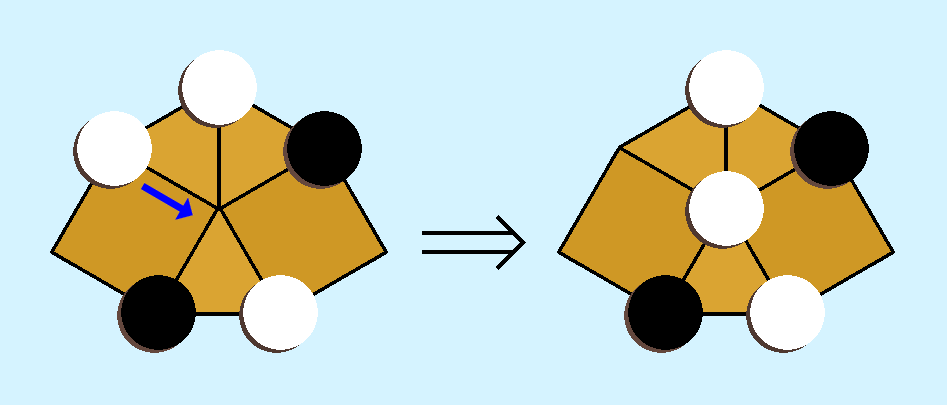
Example 3: Cornering two (no capture)

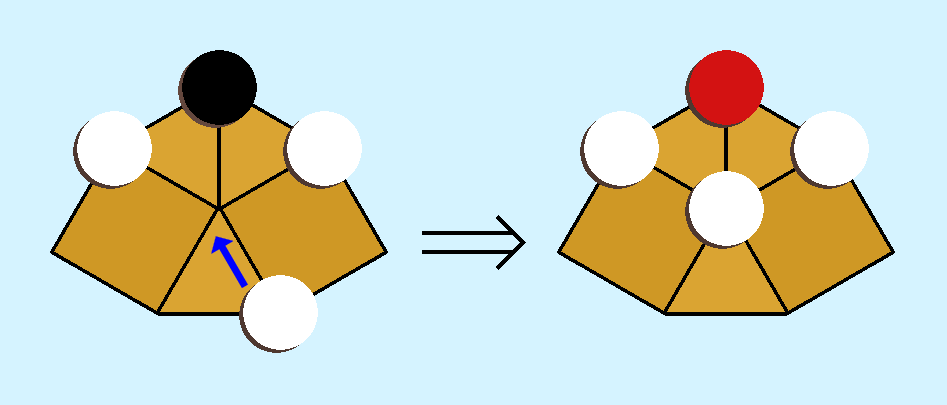
Example 4: Cornering one (capture)

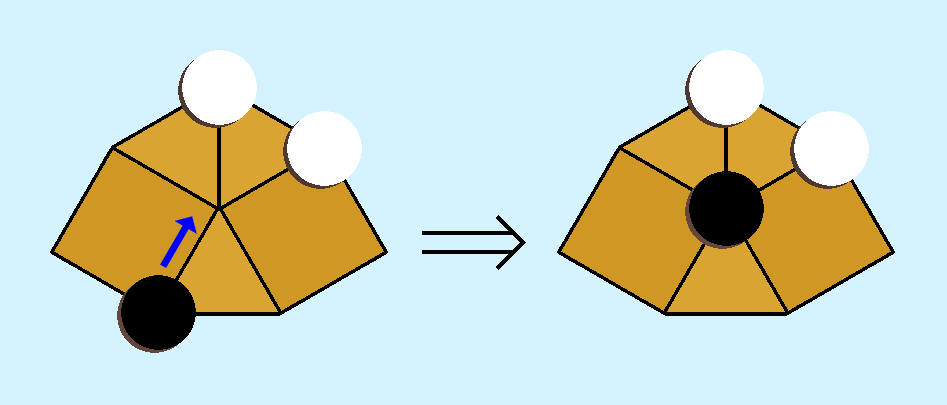
Example 5: Safe move

=== Draws ===
The game is drawn if any of the following occurs:

- The players agree to a draw.
- The player whose turn it is to move cannot move a piece.
- The position repeats three times with the same player to move each time.
- In the last 50 moves (25 moves per player) no capture has been made, nor neutral piece removed.

== Notation conventions ==
Examples of recorded moves:

b2	A piece was placed on point b2.
b1-b2	A piece was moved from b1 to b2.
b1-b2*	The move b1-b2 was a capturing move.
(b3)	A neutral piece was removed from point b3.

== See also ==
- Kensington
- Onyx – also by Larry Back, a connection game using a modified Diamond board tessellation

== Bibliography ==
- Back, Larry (February 2013). Schmittberger, R. Wayne; Orehowsky, Jennifer (eds.). "Diamond: A Strategy Game for Two Players". Games. No. 287. Games Publications. ISSN 0199-9788.
