= Gonnect =

Abstract strategy board game

Gonnect is a strategy board game for two players invented by João Pedro Neto in 2000. The game is played with standard Go equipment (usually on a 13×13 or 15×15 board) and basically uses the same rules as Go, however the goal of the game is to construct a group that connects any two opposite sides.

Seen from a superficial point of view, Gonnect belongs to the family of connection games with relatives Hex and Havannah; however, the game mutates into a game of territory (like Go) when played by advanced players.

== Game rules ==
All the rules of Go apply, except that unlike Go, passing is not allowed. The winning condition is when a player connects opposite edges of the board (either top and bottom, or left and right) with a chain of stones in that player's color. The pie rule is used to determine who moves first. A player loses if he has no legal move. In common with Go:

- A connection is formed between adjacent pieces of the same color that lie along one of the horizontal or vertical game board lines. Diagonally-adjacent pieces are not considered to be connected.
- A chain refers to a group of pieces of the same color such that all the pieces are connected through adjacent horizontal or vertical pieces.
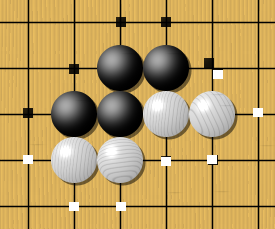
  Stones with liberties marked by square dots; this image shows one black chain and two white chains
- A stone has liberty when it is adjacent (horizontally or vertically) to an empty point. If any stone in a chain has liberty, the chain is considered to have liberty. When the chain has no liberty, it is considered to be captured and is removed from the board.
- Players are forbidden from playing a stone that creates a chain of that player's color without liberties, unless that completes a capture and creates a liberty (suicide rule).
- Players are forbidden from making a move that would recreate the same board position as after their previous move (ko rule).

Games between skilled players often end up temporarily deadlocked, since the square Go board allows a "four corners" configuration where neither side can strongly connect; however, since players cannot pass, they eventually must start filling in the internal liberties of their groups. The player who has gained the smallest amount of territory usually loses, so building more territory than your opponent is a means of forcing a connection and winning.

Thus, a Gonnect game between similarly skilled-opponents generally unfolds in three stages:

1. Board-filling stage – opponents race to connect sides until the position is deadlocked
2. Eye-making stage – players squeeze their opponent's territory to form safe groups with at least two eyes
3. Eye-filling stage – players must fill in their own eye space or destroy their opponent's

=== Example ===
In this example on a 13×13 board, Black has built a winning chain from A7-A8-A9 in the middle of the left side connecting to N2-N3 on the right side near the bottom corner. Because D10 and E9 are not considered adjacent because they are diagonal to each other, so there is no second winning Black chain from A9 to N11-12-13.

== History ==
Gonnect was discovered on July 18, 2000 by Dr. João Neto, while he was updating his website "Variations on Go". He was aiming to combine the play of Go with the connection objective of Hex, but was stymied by the deadlocks resulting from two-eye structures. In discussion with other game players, Neto realized that adding a "no pass" rule would resolve this. Rules have been published proposing the use of both 13×13 and 9×9 boards, although 9×9 and smaller boards give the first player (Black) a strong advantage.
