= Star (board game) =

Two-player abstract strategy board game

Star is a two-player abstract strategy board game developed by Craige Schensted (now Ea Ea). It was first published in the September 1983 issue of Games magazine. It is a connection game similar to Hex, Y, Havannah, and TwixT. Unlike these games, however, the result is based on a player having a higher final score rather than achieving a specific goal. He has since developed a slightly more complicated version called *Star with better balance between edge and center moves, writing "*Star is what those other games wanted to be."

== Game rules ==
A 6×7 Star board, which refers to the alternating lengths of each side. Because there are 36 cells forming the perimeter, touching 39 partial hexagon border cells, the sum of both players' scores will be 37.

Star is played on a board of hexagonal cells. Although the board can have any size and shape, a board with unequal edges is generally used to avoid ties. Players may not place stones on the partial hexagon border cells along the edge of the board; these are used for scoring. One player places black stones on the board; the other player places white stones.

The game begins with one player placing a stone on the board. To avoid giving an advantage to the first player, a pie rule is used, allowing the second player to switch sides at that point. Players then alternate turns, placing a stone on an empty cell on the board. Players may pass; the game is over when both players pass.

At the end of the game the players count their scores. A "star" is a group of connected stones belonging to one player that touches at least three partial-hex border cells. The score of a star is the number of partial-hex border cells it touches minus two. A player's score is the total of all the stars of that player's color. The player with the higher score wins.

For any given board, the total final score of the two players is constant. The combined score of the two players is equal to the number of partial-hex border cells, less two.

=== Example ===
Example game on a 5×6 board, won by Black (17–14)

This 5×6 board has 75 cells in 10 rows (1–10) and 11 columns (A–J) which touch 33 partial-hex border cells.

White has five distinct stars with a total net score of 14.

1. The star touching cell [A2] contacts 6 border cells and has a net score of 4 points
2. Touching [B1], 8 border cells; net score 6
3. Touching [D8], 3 border cells; net score 1
4. Touching [H10], 3 border cells; net score 1
5. Touching [J5], 4 border cells; net score 2

Black has two distinct stars with a total net score of 17.

1. Touching [A1], 18 border cells; net score 16
2. Touching [D1], 3 border cells; net score 1

Black wins by more effectively connecting its stars. For example, if the stone at [D3] were white instead, that would connect its first two stars and the net score would be 6+8-2 = 12 instead of 10. Likewise, this would disconnect the large Black star, which would be split into two stars, contacting 3 and 15 border cells, for a net score of 3+15-4 = 14 instead of 16. Although this single change would not have been sufficient for White to win, it illustrates the reward for connecting stars.

5×6 Star board, modified so each perimeter cell is 2 points.

Because of the board's geometry, the six corner perimeter cells [A1], [A5], [F1], [F10], [J5], and [J10] each contact 3 border cells and would score one point each with a single occupying stone. Schensted felt this was an unfair advantage and proposed a rule change to make these cells worth two points each instead. This can be accomplished by modifying those corner cells to be five-sided; the removal of the six small partial scoring cells at the corners means the resulting total score of both players is 25 on the 5×6 board.

For the example game illustrated here, the revised score is White 11, Black 14 with the modified 2-point corners. Each player occupied three corner cells in this example, so the score is reduced by three points each using the modified board.

== History ==
Sample Poly-Y board with nine sides and 208 cells

Schensted first developed Poly-Y in the 1970s, a more generalized version of Y in that Y is the special case of Poly-Y using a board with three sides and corners. Through experimentation, Schensted discovered that a board with nine sides and corners and seven elements per side was ideal; more corners would mean shorter sides, and players could make a "Y" touching three sides relatively easily.

After R. Wayne Schmittberger contacted Schensted in the early 1980s, asking to publish Poly-Y in Games magazine, Schensted dusted off the concept and playtested it with his wife, Irene. During one of their games, they decided to grant a bonus to the player who more effectively linked their groups together to avoid ties, resulting in the rules for Star.
