= Connection game =

Abstract strategy game subgenre

A connection game is a type of abstract strategy game in which players attempt to complete a specific type of connection with their pieces. This could involve forming a path between two or more endpoints, completing a closed loop, or connecting all of one's pieces so they are adjacent to each other. Connection games typically have simple rules, but complex strategies. They have minimal components and may be played as board games, computer games, or even paper-and-pencil games.

In many connection games, the goal is to connect two opposite sides of the board. In these games, players take turns placing or moving pieces until one player has a continuous line of pieces connecting their two sides of the playing area. Hex, TwixT, and PÜNCT are typical examples of this type of game.

== History ==
According to Browne, Hex (developed independently by the mathematicians Piet Hein and John Nash in the 1940s) is considered to be the first connection game, although earlier games involving connectivity have been noted to predate Hex, including Lightning (1890s) and Zig-Zag (1932). Martin Gardner is credited with popularizing the genre in his writeup of Hex in Scientific American (1957), expanded and republished in Mathematical Puzzles & Diversions (1959). It was shown, starting with smaller boards, the player making the first move had a decided advantage, depending on where the initial move was made. In his 1959 book, Gardner also mentions that Claude Shannon proposed a modified version of Hex that would be played on a board with three equal-length sides; the winning condition would be changed to the first to connect all three sides. This was a variant of the game Y, which was a generalization of Hex that had been invented independently by John Milnor, Charles Titus, and Craige Schensted in the early 1950s.

Hex and Y were examples of games where the players competed to build a path connecting sides of the board. In the June 2000 issue of Games, R. Wayne Schmittberger identified an additional sub-class of connection game in which points were bridged to form connections although the overall goal – forging a path connecting opposite sides of the board – was the same. These games included Gale/Bridg-it (1958/1960) and TwixT (1962). Schmittberger also identified a third sub-class where serpentiles with preprinted paths, such as Psyche-paths/Kaliko (1970) and Trax (1981), were used. In 1984, Larry Back began developing what would become Onyx, a connection game with a capturing mechanic.

== Popular connection games ==
Examples of the three winning structures in Havannah, on a base-8 board. From left to right, they are the fork, the ring and the bridge.

=== Havannah ===
Havannah is a two-player abstract strategy board game invented by Christian Freeling. Unlike Hex or other connection games, Havannah has three conditions that enable a player to win: creating a Fork; creating a Bridge; or creating a Ring. A ring is a loop around one or more cells regardless of whether or not the encircled cells are occupied by any player or empty. A bridge connects any two of the six corner cells of the board. A fork connects any three edges of the board (a corner point is not considered part of an edge). Havannah has "a sophisticated and varied strategy" and is best played on a base-10 hexagonal board, 10 hex cells to a side.

The game was published for a period in Germany by Ravensburger, with a smaller, base-8 board suitable for beginners. It is currently only produced by Hexboards, a Dutch company that produces laser-carved gaming boards.

=== Hex ===
11×11 Hex gameboard showing a winning configuration for Blue

Hex is a two player abstract strategy board game in which players attempt to connect opposite sides of a hexagonal board. Hex was invented by mathematician and poet Piet Hein in 1942 and independently by John Nash in 1948.

It is traditionally played on an 11×11 rhombus board, although 13×13 and 19×19 boards are also popular. Each player is assigned a pair of opposite sides of the board which they must try to connect by taking turns placing a stone of their color onto any empty space. Once placed, the stones cannot be moved or removed. A player wins when they successfully connect their sides together through a chain of adjacent stones. Draws are impossible in Hex due to the topology of the game board.

The game has deep strategy, sharp tactics and a profound mathematical underpinning related to the Brouwer fixed-point theorem. The game was first marketed as a board game in Denmark under the name Con-tac-tix, and Parker Brothers marketed a version of it in 1952 called Hex; they are no longer in production. Hex can also be played with paper and pencil on hexagonally ruled graph paper.

=== Tak ===
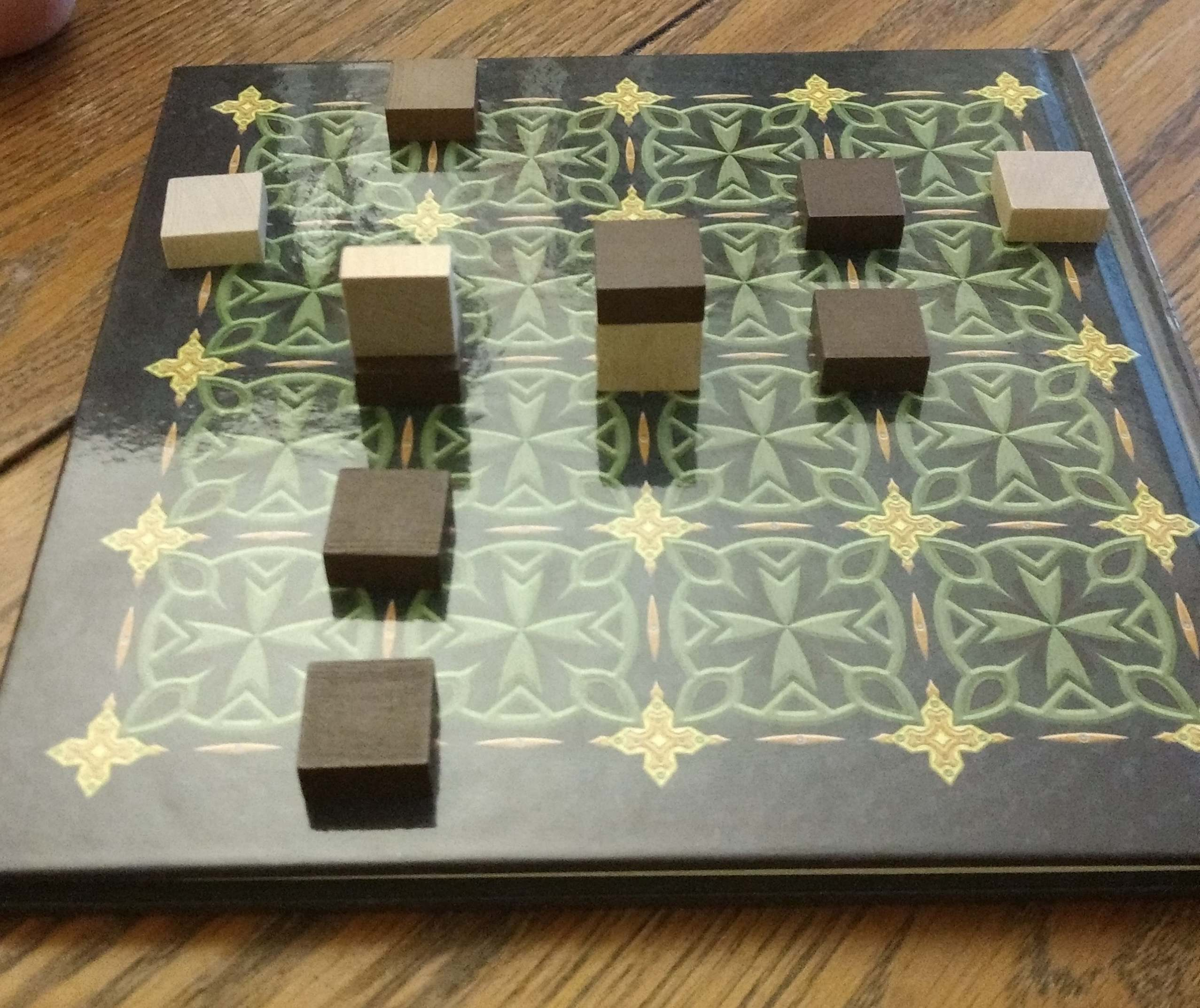
Tak being played with a "Tavern" set

Tak is a two-player abstract strategy game designed by James Ernest and Patrick Rothfuss and published by Cheapass Games in 2016. Its design was based around the fictional game of Tak described in Patrick Rothfuss' 2011 fantasy novel The Wise Man's Fear.

The goal of Tak is to be the first to connect two opposite edges of the board with your pieces, called "stones", and create a road. To accomplish this, players take turns placing their own stones and building their road while blocking and capturing their opponent's pieces to hinder their efforts at the same. A player "captures" a stone by stacking one of their pieces on top of the opponent's. This creates a three dimensional element to the game play absent in other well known connection games, such as hex. In addition the player may place and move a piece called the capstone or play normal stones "standing" up on their edge. The capstone and standing stones have different powers and rules regarding their use in the game.

=== The Game of Y ===
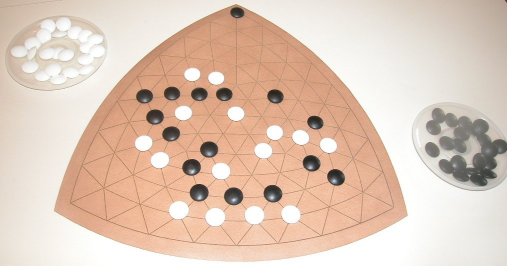
A commercially-sold Y board

Y is an abstract strategy board game, first described by John Milnor in the early 1950s. The goal of Y is similar to Hex except that each player has the identical goal of making a connection between all three sides forming a "Y" rather than "owning" specific sides that must be connected. The game was independently invented in 1953 by Craige Schensted and Charles Titus. It is an early member in a long line of games Schensted has developed, each game more complex but also more generalized.

== List of connection games ==
- Black Path Game
- Blokus
- Bridg-It, also called Gale
- Crosstrack
- Dots
- Gonnect
- Havannah
- Hex, also called Con-tac-tix, Nash, or Polygon
- Kaliko, aka Psyche-paths, using hex serpentiles
- Lines of action
- Onyx
- PÜNCT
- Qua, 3D Board Game
- Selfo
- Shannon switching game
- Star
- *Star
- Tak
- Tantrix
- Through the Desert
- Trax
- TwixT
- Y

== See also ==
- Combinatorial game theory
- Mathematical game
