= Onyx (game) =

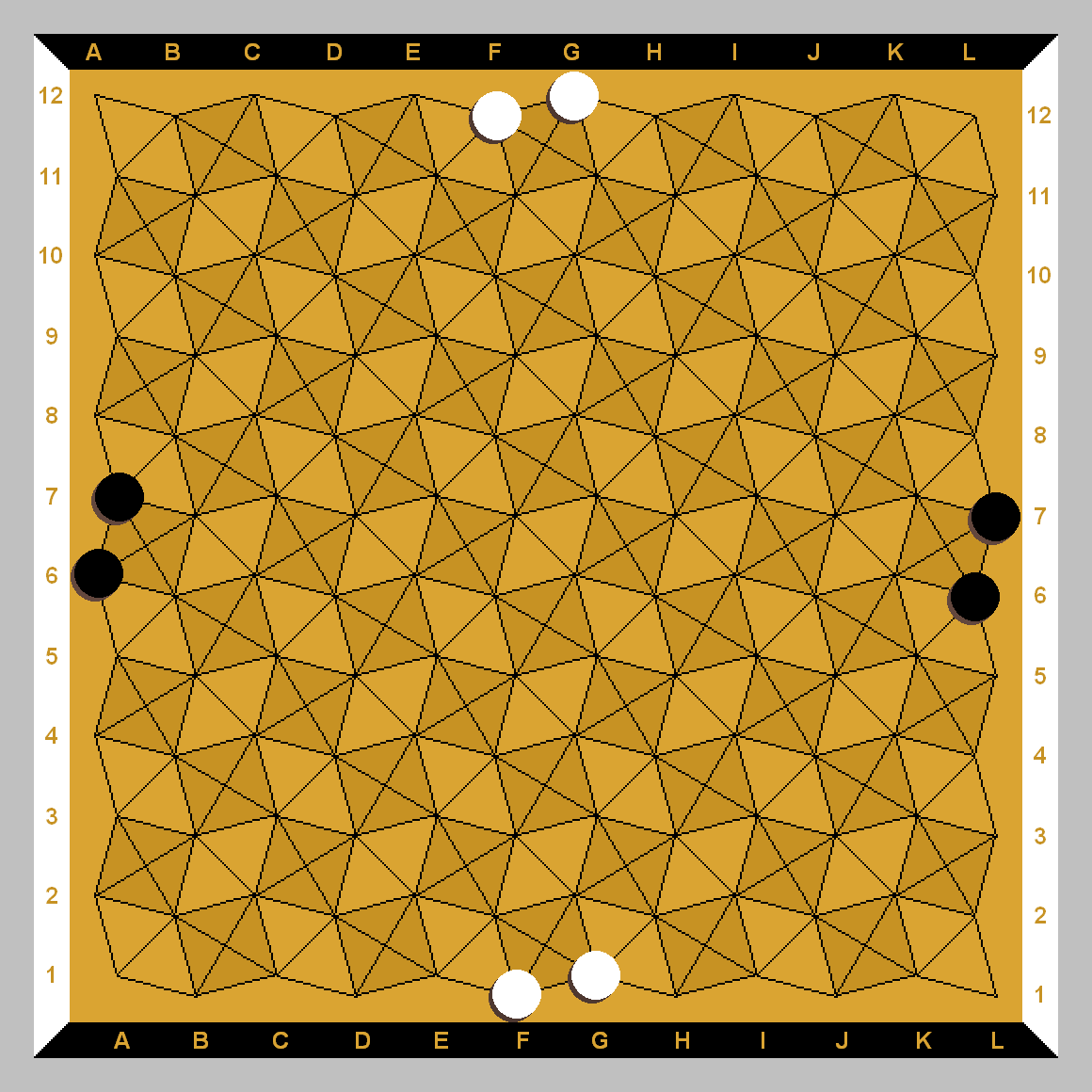
Onyx gameboard and starting position. Black moves first.

Onyx is a two-player abstract strategy board game invented by Larry Back in 1995. The game features a rule for performing captures, making Onyx unique among connection games.

The Onyx board is a grid of interlocking squares and triangles, with pieces played on the points of intersection (as in Go). Each side of the board comprises twelve points. Black tries to connect the two horizontal (black) sides with an unbroken chain of black pieces, while White tries to connect the two vertical (white) sides with an unbroken chain of white pieces. The first to do so wins the game.

Onyx was featured in several issues of Abstract Games magazine edited by Kerry Handscomb.

== Game rules ==
The initial setup has four black pieces and four white pieces pre-placed (see illustration).

- Players alternate placing stones on the board, starting with Black.
  - Black moves first by placing a black piece on any empty point of the board.
  - White follows suit. Since moving first conveys an advantage, the pie rule can be invoked. This gives White the one-time option to switch sides after Black's first move.
- A piece can be placed on the midpoint of a square only if all four corners of that square are currently unoccupied.
- Once placed, pieces do not move unless captured. Captured pieces are immediately removed from the game.

=== Capture rule ===
Capture examples in Onyx on a mini 6×6 board

The rule for capturing allows a player to capture up to two enemy pieces in a single turn. All of the following conditions must be met:

- the two enemy pieces occupy opposite corners of a square;
- a third corner of the square is already occupied by a piece owned by the capturing player;
- the square's midpoint is unoccupied.

The capture is executed by placing a piece on the remaining unoccupied corner of the square. If the capturing move also simultaneously completes a second square on the board where the same conditions prevail, then the move results in the capture of four enemy pieces instead of two. This possibility arises since each corner of a square on the Onyx board, with exception of corners at the board's edge, is also a corner of a second, adjoining square.

For example, if Black places a stone on [B5] as shown on the 6×6 mini-board, that completes the square {AB-45} and the White stones at [A5] and [B4] are captured. The illustration also shows a double-capture: if White places a stone on [C3], that completes two squares ({BC-34} and {CD-23}) and the Black stones at [B3], [C2], [C4], and [D3] are all captured and removed from the board. If Black moves first and captures the two White stones, the double-capture cannot occur as the [B4] corner would no longer be occupied after the capture and removal.

== Observations: non-repeating positions ==
Onyx has the interesting property that, despite having a capture rule, it seems positions never repeat in a normally played game. That is, if at least one player is trying to win then it does not appear to be possible to have an Onyx position where, after a number of moves have been made, some of which are captures resulting in the removal of pieces from the board, the game returns to the same position. It seems the only way a position can be repeated in Onyx is if both players conspire to bring this about. However, while experience indicates that positions do not repeat, it's not obvious why this is so. In fact, it may be possible to construct an Onyx position where, with correct play, the position will repeat after a number of moves. But such a position has never been discovered and it may be the case that it's impossible to create one. Therefore, one interesting challenge with Onyx is to construct a position that repeats with correct play or to prove that it is impossible to do so.

== Notation conventions ==
Each point on the Onyx board, except for midpoints of squares, is notated by a letter followed by a number in a zig-zagging coordinate system. The midpoint of a square is described by two letters followed by two numbers that uniquely identify the square's corners.

An asterisk (*) following a notated move indicates that one pair of pieces was captured; two asterisks (**) indicates that two pairs were captured.

== Variations ==
- Open Variation. Instead of the initial setup shown, players can begin the game with the Onyx board empty. (Note: The standard setup with pre-placed pieces, however, "tends to sharpen the play and results in more interesting positions". (Back 2000:11).)
- The Onyx board can be varied in size, with more or less than twelve points per side. The next highest board size that still allows the starting pieces to be placed centrally is 16×16. (Note: "A larger board results in more strategic depth but also a longer game. It seems a board [...] with twelve points along each side is ideal for this game." (Back 2000:11). Some puzzles have been composed for Mini-Onyx boards having six points per side (Back 2000:12).)

== See also ==
- Connection games
- Diamond – also by Larry Back, using a similar gameboard tessellation
