= Y (game) =

Abstract strategy board game

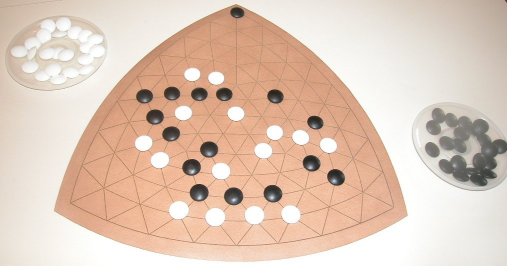
A commercially-sold Y board, featuring three pentagonal points within the hex grid, representing a quarter of a geodesic sphere

Y is an abstract strategy board game, first described by John Milnor in the early 1950s. The game was independently invented in 1953 by Craige Schensted and Charles Titus. It is a member of the connection game family inhabited by Hex, Havannah, TwixT, and others; it is also an early member in a long line of games Schensted has developed, each game more complex but also more generalized.

== Gameplay ==
Y is typically played on a triangular board with hexagonal spaces; the "official" Y board has three points with five-connectivity instead of six-connectivity, but it is just as playable on a regular triangle. Schensted and Titus' book Mudcrack Y & Poly-Y has a large number of boards for play of Y, all hand-drawn; most of them seem irregular but turn out to be topologically identical to a regular Y board.

A simple board, 8 spaces per side

As in most games of this type, one player takes the part of Black and one takes the part of White; they place stones on the board one at a time, neither removing nor moving any previously placed stones. The pie rule can be used to mitigate any first-move advantage.

== Rules ==
The rules are as follows:

- Players take turns placing one stone of their color on the board.
- Once a player connects all three sides of the board with a single, connected set of stones, the game ends and that player wins. The corners count as belonging to both sides of the board to which they are adjacent.

As in most connection games, the size of the board changes the nature of the game; small boards tend towards pure tactical play, whereas larger boards tend to make the game more strategic.

== Relation to other connection games ==
Schensted and Titus argue that Y is a superior game to Hex because Hex can be seen as a subset of Y.

Schensted and Titus argue that Y is a superior game to Hex because Hex can be seen as a subset of Y. Consider a board subdivided by a line of white and black pieces into three sections. The portion of the board at the bottom-right can then be considered a 5×5 Hex board, and played identically. However, this sort of artificial construction on a Y board is extremely uncommon, and the games have different enough tactics (outside of constructed situations) to be considered separate, though related.

Mudcrack Y & Poly-Y also describes Poly-Y, the next game in the series of Y-related games; after that come Star and *Star.

== Criticism ==
Y, like Hex, yields a strong first-player advantage. The standard approach to solving this difficulty is the "pie" rule: one player chooses where the first move will go and the other player then chooses who will be the first player.

Y's chief criticism is that on the standard hexagonal board a player controlling center can easily reach any edge no matter what the other player does. This is because the distance from the center to an edge is only approximately 1/3 the distance along the edge from corner to corner. As a result, defending an edge against a center attack is very difficult.

Schensted and Titus attacked this problem with successive versions of the game board, culminating in the present "official" board with three pentagons inserted among the hexagons. They noted that were players to play on a hemisphere rather than a plane with hexagons, with the equator divided into three "sides" (each 1/3 the circumference of the hemisphere), the distance from the "north pole" of the hemisphere to the equator was 1/4 the circumference, and thus the distance ratio improved from 1/3 to 3/4. This made defending a side from a center attack much more plausible. Thus the present "official" board is essentially a geodesic dome hemisphere squashed flat into a triangle to provide this effect.

== No draws ==
It has been formally shown that Y cannot end in a draw. That is, once the board is complete there must be one and only one winner.

== See also ==
- Hex
- Connection games
