= Kensington (game) =

2-player abstract strategy board game

Kensington gameboard

Kensington is an abstract strategy board game devised by Brian Taylor and Peter Forbes in 1979, named after London's Kensington Gardens, which contains the mosaic upon which the gameboard is patterned. It is played on a geometrical board based on the rhombitrihexagonal tiling pattern. The objective of the game is to capture a hexagon by occupying the six surrounding vertices. The game is simple while still allowing for complex strategy. The placing and movement of tokens have been compared to nine men's morris.

== Board ==
The gameboard consists of a combination of seven regular hexagons (2 red, 2 blue and 3 white), thirty squares, and twenty-four triangles. The board is composed of 72 total vertices where tokens can be placed.

== Gameplay ==
The two players, Red and Blue, alternately place tokens of their respective color on unoccupied vertices of the board until each has placed fifteen. Thereafter they alternate turns sliding a single token of their color along a line to an adjacent unoccupied vertex.

A player who occupies the three vertices of any triangle with tokens of their color has formed a mill and may relocate one enemy token to any other unoccupied vertex. A double mill is formed by occupying the four vertices of any square; doing so allows the player to relocate two enemy tokens. No more than two tokens may be relocated in a single turn, even if a player completes a mill and double mill with the same move.

The winner is the first player to occupy all six vertices of either any white hexagon or one of their own color. A win can be achieved during either the placement or movement phases of the game.

If, in the movement phase, a player cannot move, the other player may move again.

== Strategy ==
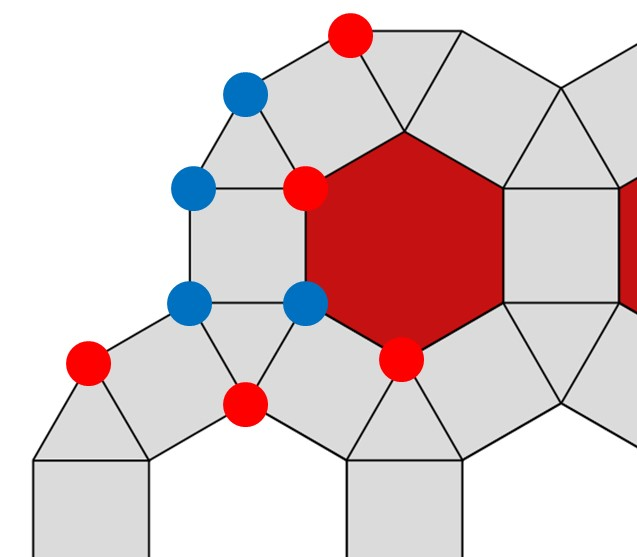
Once a player forms a mill, a common strategy is to sequester relocated tokens into a jail where they cannot form mills. Here Red has jailed four of Blue's tokens.

There is debate in the Kensington community as to the relative advantage of placing first or second. The player to place second also gets to place last which is a definite advantage because that placement cannot be directly countered. This advantage is offset by the other player being able to move first in the sliding phase. Most beginning players will find more success placing second.

Red can move a token back and forth creating a new mill every turn. This is a powerful configuration which will quickly give Red control of the game.

Often, the player who makes the first mill is able to scatter the opponent's tokens and win without difficulty. However, a skilled player may be able to recover from an opponent's mill. Relocated tokens can group together to form a mill across the board from their original locations. A popular strategy is to use one's tokens to form "jails" where the opponent's relocated tokens are sequestered and unable to form mills or hexagons.

Defense is very difficult and thus much of the game revolves around being first to secure a mill. The game often ends soon after the first mill is formed. A very powerful configuration is to be able to move a single token back and forth between two spaces creating a mill each turn. This results in certain victory.

== Marketing ==
In a business venture parallel to Trivial Pursuit in Canada, the British inventors set up their own company to make and publish the game. This attracted a fair amount of press attention at the time and Kensington picked up a UK Game of the Year award. Attention for the game was short-lived and the game is now out of print, but second-hand copies are readily available online.

=== 1979 edition ===
A 1979 edition was sold in a package resembling a double-LP album. The front part had a cut-out showing the centre of the one-piece non-folding gameboard which could be slid out of the sleeve like an LP. Rules were printed on the inside and the rear side showed the authors playing the game on the steps of the Albert Memorial. In the rules the authors offered a prize of £10,000 to the first person to find a position in which neither player of a two-player game could move.

== Reception ==
Games included Kensington in their "Top 100 Games of 1982", finding the way pieces are positioned and moved was "reminiscent of nine men’s morris, but this game is more sophisticated."

== Reviews ==
- Jeux & Stratégie #20

== See also ==
- Diamond—a game inspired by Kensington
