= Tsuro =

Board game

- Designers: Tom McMurchie
- Publishers: Calliope Games
- Players: 2-8
- Playing time: 15 minutes

Tsuro is a tile-based board game designed by Tom McMurchie, originally published by WizKids and now published by Calliope Games.

Tsuro is a board game for two to eight players. To play, players compete to have the last playing piece remaining on the board. Player turns consist of placing truchet tiles on the board from the player's hand. Then they move their respective pieces along these paths. Players are eliminated by following a path that ends at the board edge.

There have also been a number of differently themed Tsuro editions and expansions released, beginning with Tsuro of the Seas. Although core gameplay remains the same, some versions feature expanded rules or larger boards.

The name of the game is taken from the Japanese word tsūro (通路) meaning "route". The word, written in kanji, appears in the art on the game board.

== Gameplay ==
The game is played on a square board that is divided into a six-by-six grid of squares. There are eight player markers, thirty-five standard path tiles, and one Dragon tile. Before the game begins, the Dragon tile is set aside.

To start, each player chooses a different colored playing piece and places their marker on any of the white notches that surround the edge of the board; each edge has twelve notches. The path tiles are shuffled and each player is dealt three path tiles; the remainder are left as a draw pile. Each turn includes a tile-laying phase and then a marker movement phase. The turn ends with the active player drawing another path tile.

In each turn, the active player must place a tile in the square adjacent to their piece. Once placed, the piece moves along the line in front of it. If the placed tile connects to the path that another player's piece is on, the other (inactive) player must move their piece to the end of the line on the newly-placed tile. Sometimes this will cause the piece to go off the board, in which case that player is eliminated. The active player may not choose to connect their path to the edge of the board (eliminating that player), unless no other move is available. If two pieces end up on the same path, both players are out. The unused path tiles of the players that are eliminated are shuffled into the draw pile. The winner is the player with the last remaining marker on the board.

The Dragon tile is only used when there are three or more players. When there are no more tiles to draw from, the player takes the Dragon tile. This is to indicate that they will draw from the pile after the eliminated players give up their unplayed tiles, regardless of whether they are the active player or not. The Dragon tile is set aside once the draw pile has been restocked.

=== Tiles ===
Numbering convention for entry points

There are thirty-five possible permutations for a four-sided tile with two entry points per side and four paths linking the eight points. In the table below, tiles are named according to the connected points. Points are numbered sequentially anti-clockwise from the left point on the bottom edge, so the bottom edge contains points 1 (left) and 2 (right), the right edge contains points 3 (lower) and 4 (upper), the top edge contains points 5 (right) and 6 (left), and the left edge contains points 7 (upper) and 8 (lower). The nomenclature AB-CD-EF-GH indicates that points A and B are connected, C and D are connected, E and F are connected, and G and H are connected. A single 90° rotation anti-clockwise will increment each number by 2 (modulo 8) to determine path connections when rotated.

Planes of symmetry		Possible rotational orientations	Tiles
Quadruple	(vertical, horizontal, and both diagonals)	1	12-34-56-78 14-27-36-58 15-26-37-48 16-25-38-47 18-23-45-67
Double	(vertical and horizontal)	2	12-37-48-56 12-38-47-56 16-25-37-48 17-24-35-68
Double	(both diagonals)	2	15-27-36-48 17-28-35-46 18-26-37-45 18-27-36-45
Single	(180° symmetry)	2	13-26-48-57 15-28-37-46
Single	(vertical or horizontal, depending on orientation)	4	12-35-47-68 12-36-47-58 12-38-45-67 12-38-46-57 17-24-36-58 18-23-46-57
Single	(one diagonal)	4	12-34-57-68 12-34-58-67 16-23-47-58 16-28-35-47 17-23-46-58 17-28-36-45
None	(left & right-handed pairs)	4	12-36-48-57 12-37-46-58
None	(left & right-handed pairs)	4	12-37-45-68 12-35-48-67
None	(left & right-handed pairs)	4	13-26-47-58 15-28-36-47
None	(left & right-handed pairs)	4	13-25-48-67 16-28-37-45

== Alternate editions and expansions ==
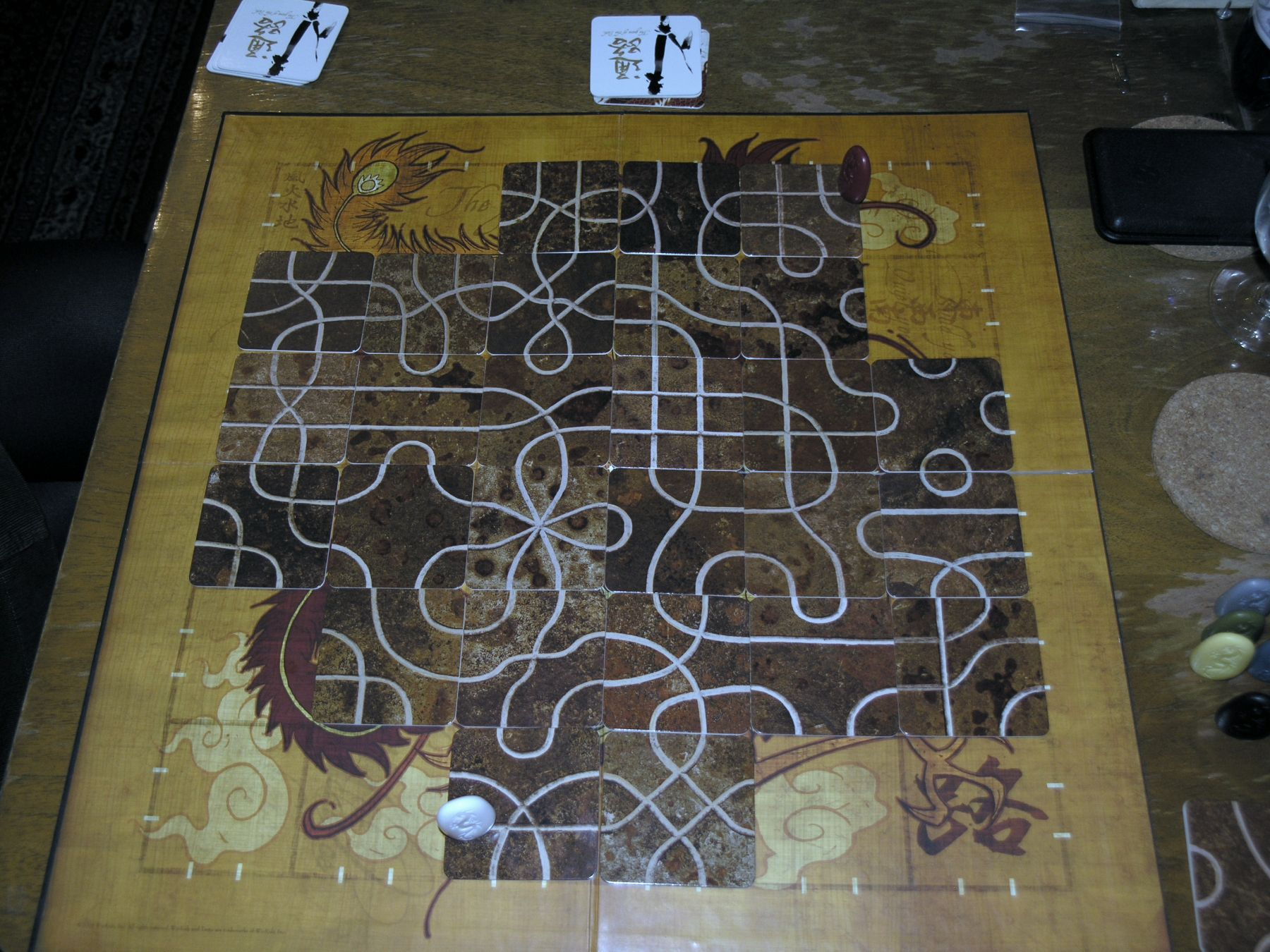
Tsuro game near the end, with two players remaining

=== History ===
McMurchie received a patent for the "Squiggle game" in 1979. The 1979 patent described two different implementations; the first, commercialized largely intact as Tsuro, used the square tiles with two entry points per side and four paths, while the second used square tiles similarly with eight entry points and four paths per tile, but the entry points were changed to the middle of each side and at each corner instead. In both cases, the preferred board size was a 6×6 grid and what became the Dragon tile was initially called the NEXT card. The patent also provided specific names for player actions:

- SHORT CUTS: when a player is connected to a previously unused path, the player is required to advance their piece to the end of the newly-connected path.
- SUICIDE: an illegal move in which a player connects their own path to the edge of the board (unless no other legal move is possible).
- MEDDLING: a player's legal move which extends the path of another player; the other player is required to advance their piece to the end of the newly-connected path.
- COLLISIONS: connecting the paths of two players, forcing them both out of the game. In effect, the start of one player's path serves as the connection to the edge for the other player and vice versa.
- INHERITANCE: when a player's action results in another player (or players) being eliminated, the active player may exchange any number of cards in their own hand with the cards held by the eliminated player(s); the remaining cards from the eliminated player(s) are shuffled back into the draw pile.

One of the patents cited by the examiner was US3309092A (1963) by Hardesty and Schenck, entitled "Competitive road building and travel game", which included a variety of square tiles, including what they called "tiles with two, three or four roads" similar in pattern to the Tsuro tiles. Dawne and Jordan Weisman, the owners of Games and Gizmos in Redmond, Washington watched McMurchie playing Squiggles and asked him if he would be interested in publishing the game. The Weismans had founded the games publishing company WizKids and reworked Squiggles into Tsuro, switching the original 1950s theme to one that was Japanese-inspired. The game was released in 2005.

WizKids was later acquired by Topps and then NECA, and the rights for the game reverted back to Tom McMurchie. Ray Wehrs, who had been the director of sales for WizKids, purchased a license from McMurchie and founded Calliope Games in 2011 with Tsuro as its flagship product. In 2012, actor and blogger Wil Wheaton featured the game in one of his YouTube videos, causing sales to spike.

=== Variants ===
Example of gameplay, from the video game version.

After Calliope Games began publishing Tsuro, different versions and spin-offs of the game were created. The game is available for mobile devices and computers with apps developed by Thunderbox Entertainment. The game also has been published in multiple languages including a German, a Greek and a multilingual version.

The German version of Tsuro was published in 2007 by KOSMOS. In addition to the language translation, the game's individual player pieces were little tree figures instead of the dragon stones, and the board was made two-sided, with the other side being a 7×7 grid. The 35 unique tiles were expanded to a set of 64, with some duplication of paths, and players would randomly choose 35 (plus the Dragon/Next tile) for play on the 6×6 side of the board. The KOSMOS-published variant was licensed by a Greek publisher, Kaissa, and released in that market.

The first Tsuro spin-off created was a Star Wars-themed spin-off called Asteroid Escape. This version of Tsuro was published in 2011 by Abysse Corp, exclusively in France. Asteroid Escape has additional asteroid tiles, which remove any player that lands on them instantly. They are placed on the board randomly at the start of (and occasionally during) the game, and move randomly as the game progresses, consuming any tiles or players in their path. The board is also slightly larger, 7x7 instead of 6x6. In addition, the player's individual pieces are cardboard spaceships.

In 2012, Calliope Games published Tsuro of the Seas, which included similar changes, after receiving funding from Kickstarter. The game's creators included the original creator of Tsuro, Tom McMurchie, and Jordan Weisman. Tsuro of the Seas has a few changed gameplay aspects and visuals, including player pieces shaped like boats and daikaiju tiles, which are equivalent to the asteroid tiles.

Tsuro of the Seas later received an expansion called Veterans of the Seas, published in 2013 by Calliope Games. This expansion includes four new types of tiles that all do different things. There is the mystical portal tile that moves ships and daikaiju tiles to new paths on the board. The tsunami tile moves steadily across the board, giving players a new obstacle they must overcome by rolling a die. If the player does not roll high enough they are eliminated from the game. The whirlpool tile destroys all ships and daikaiju tiles it comes in contact with. The cannon tiles are a defensive card players can use to defend themselves from daikaiju.

Tsuro: Phoenix Rising was initially funded by Kickstarter and released in 2019 by Calliope. Like the original game, Phoenix Rising is played on a 6×6 board with 36 square tiles, each with four paths. However, the tiles in Phoenix are classified as either "center" tiles (total of 16 "center" tiles) or "edge" tiles (20 "edge" tiles). These tiles have additional entry points at the corners and the center tiles are pre-placed in the center of the board prior to starting play. Tiles are flipped or rotated during play, and the goal of the game is to create and collect seven stars by traversing paths.

In 2022, Calliope Games announced that a "Luxury Limited Edition" of the original Tsuro would be released later that year; changes included upgraded materials, including carved stone tiles, satin tile storage bag, bamboo rules scroll, and wooden box, individually numbered. The limited edition set was priced at US$350.

== Reviews ==
- Pyramid

== See also ==
- Black Path Game
