= Craige Schensted =

American mathematician

Craige Schensted (April 12, 1927 – January 22, 2021), who formally changed his name to Ea Ea, was an American physicist and mathematician who first formulated the insertion algorithm (Schensted 1961) that defines the Robinson–Schensted correspondence. Under a different form, that correspondence had earlier been described by Gilbert de Beauregard Robinson in 1938, but it is due to the Schensted insertion algorithm that the correspondence has become widely known in combinatorics. Schensted also designed several board games including *Star, Star, and Y.

In 1995, he changed his name to Ea, the Babylonian name for the Sumerian god Enki, interested in the god's creative and empathetic nature. This became Ea Ea in 1999, in anticipation of the millennium computer glitches. He lived for forty years on Peaks Island in Portland, Maine.
