= Tantrix =

Abstract strategy game

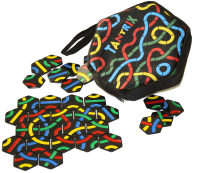
- Players place hexagonal tiles to create the longest line or loop.
- Publication: 1988
- Players: 1–4
- Setup time: 1 minute
- Playing time: 30 minutes
- Chance: Medium
- Skills: Strategic thought

Tantrix is a hexagonal tile-based abstract game invented by Mike McManaway from New Zealand. Each of the 56 different tiles in the set contains three lines, going from one edge of the tile to another. No two lines on a tile have the same colour. There are four colours in the set: red, yellow, blue, and green. No two tiles are identical, and each is individually numbered from 1 through 56.

== Etymology ==
The name Tantrix has been explained as a blend of either tangle or tangram and matrix.

== Gameplay ==
In the multiplayer version of the game, each player chooses a colour, so there are between two and four players. Each draws one tile from the bag, and the person who draws the highest number goes first.

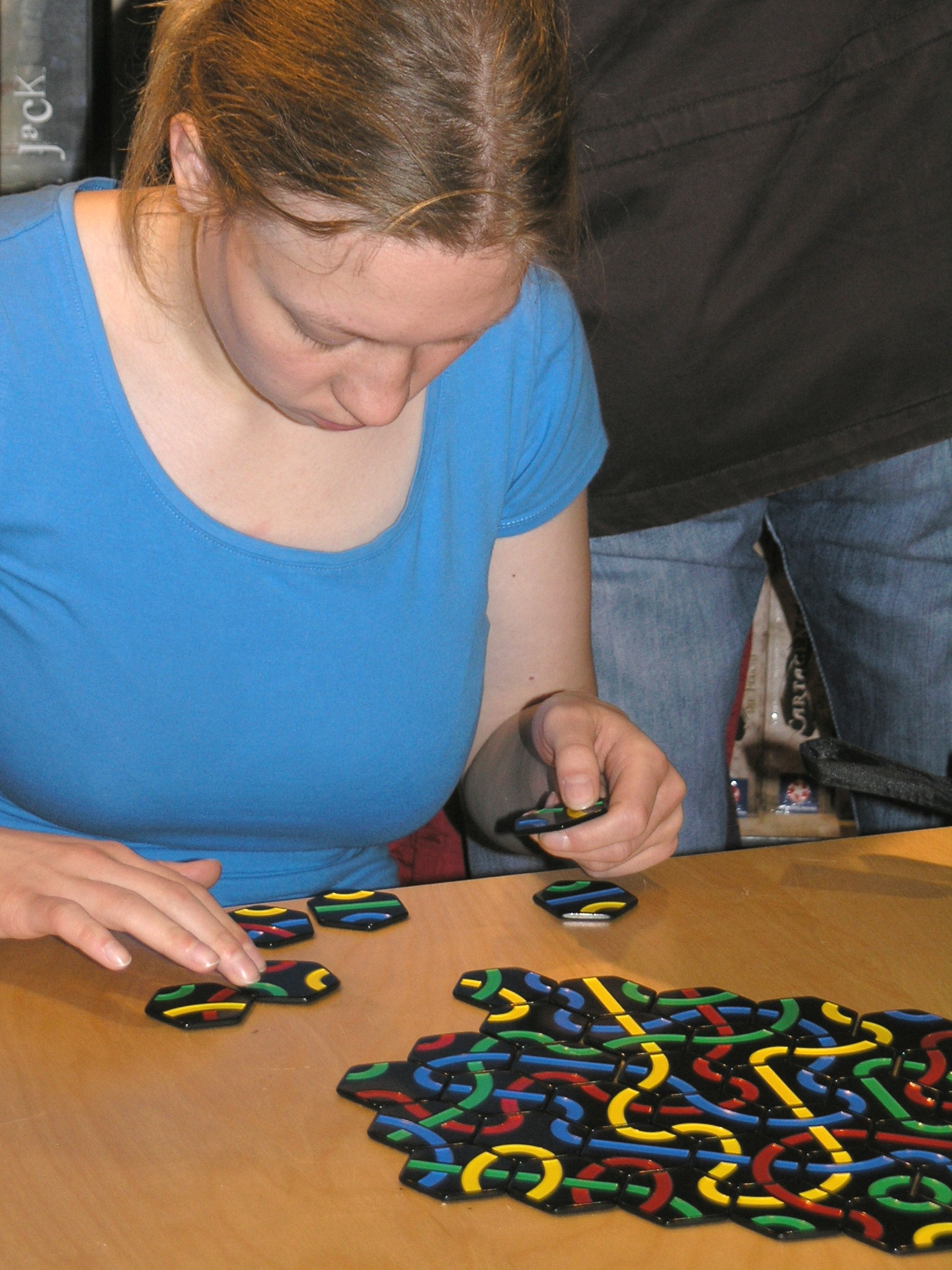
Playing Tantrix

Each player then takes five more tiles from the bag, and places all six tiles face up in front of them. The first person plays one tile, usually with their colour on it. Play then rotates clockwise. After playing a tile, each player takes a replacement tile from the bag, so that they always have six in front of them. Tiles played must match the colour of the edges adjoining it.

When three tiles surround an empty space so that it is effectively half covered this is called a forced space. If the person whose turn it is has a tile that fills that space they must play it. The player repeats this process until there are no more forced spaces that they can fill, at which stage they make a free move, where they can play any tile as long as they don't breach the three restriction rules given below. Once they have had a free move, they must then fill any more forced spaces that they can. Thus one player's turn can consist of several moves.

The three restriction rules are:

1. You cannot create a forced space with the same colour leading into it three times.
2. You cannot create a four-sided forced space.
3. You cannot play along an edge that, when forced spaces are filled, will create a four-sided forced space.

Once there are no tiles left in the bag, the three restriction rules do not apply.

The aim of the game is to get the longest line or loop in your colour. Each tile in a line counts as one point, and in a loop is two points. Only the highest-scoring line or loop counts.

=== Online play ===
Although quiet and underpopulated compared to the standards of Yahoo! Games and the like, playing Tantrix online has gained a dedicated following with players from all over the world competing against each other or against computer robots. Players are rated out of 1000 points according to their wins and losses and taking into account of their opponents rank. The aim of top players is to get to 1000 points (which only three players have managed so far). The goal of a regular player is to reach the score of 950 which is difficult to reach. Once this score has been attained the player can gain Tournament Rankings (ELO) and eventually earn the title "Master". Masters can then play "master games" which have a different scoring system. Only a few players achieve master status, with a limit of 120 total imposed.

Serious players of Tantrix take part in a number of structured tournaments each year. Although the winners only play for bragging rights, and in the major tournaments a small trophy to keep for a year, these events are taken seriously, and are the ultimate challenge for tantricists.

The WORLD TANTRIX CHAMPIONSHIP begins every August, and takes nearly four months to complete. Only 47 competitors took place in the second WTC in 1998, but that number had grown to 200 by 2006. The tournament starts in a qualifying round, where the lower-ranked players compete for selection into the main draw (128-player knockout tournament).

There are three other "world-wide" tournaments held online each year:

- The World Team Tantrix Championship (WTTC) involving teams of five from one country or region, first in held in 2002
- The World Junior Tantrix Championship (WJTC) a world championship for players under 16, first held in 2002
- The World Doubles Tantrix Championship (WDTC) first played in 2005

There are also three continental tournaments each year:

- The European Championship (Euro) the major dedicated continental tournament, first run in 1999
- The Pan-American Tantrix Championship (Pan-Am) first held in 1999
- The Afro-Asian Championship (AsAf) the African Championship was first held in 1999 once, then re-established in 2004, incorporating Asian competitors at the same time

And many national online tournaments:

- The New Zealand Tantrix Championship first held in 2000
- The Australian Tantrix Championship first held in 2001
- The Hungarian Tantrix Championship first held in 2002
- The Hungarian Masters Tournament first held in 2002
- The Swedish Tantrix Championship first held in 2003
- The French Tantrix Championship first held in 2007
- The Dutch Tantrix Championship first held in 2008
- The German Tantrix Championship first held in 2008
- The Spanish Tantrix Championship first held in 2008
- The Polish Tantrix Championship first held in 2008
- The Norwegian Tantrix Championship first held in 2009
- The Czech Tantrix Championship first held in 2010

=== Face-to-face play ===
In addition to these online tournaments, offline tournaments (referred to as 'Table Opens') are growing in popularity. The first Table tournament was the 2002 British Open and was mostly a local affair with 13 of the 14 entrants from Britain. As the player base widened, players started traveling more. Table Opens in Europe soon became the most popular because of the larger playing population. By 2009 there was enough demand to hold a World Tantrix Open.

World Opens

- 2014 World Tantrix Table Open (Bischoffen, Germany)
- 2013 World Tantrix Table Open (Trosa, Sweden)
- 2011 World Tantrix Table Open (Almere, Netherlands)
- 2010 World Tantrix Table Open (Budapest, Hungary)
- 2009 World Tantrix Table Open (Edinburgh, United Kingdom)

National Opens

- The British Table Open, first held in 2002
- The New Zealand Table Open, first held in 2004
- The Swedish Table Open, first held in 2004
- The German Table Open, first held in 2005
- The French Table Open, first held in 2005
- The Spanish Table Open, first held in 2005
- The Hungarian Table Open, first held in 2005
- The Dutch Table Open, first held in 2006
- The Polish Table Open, first held in 2007
- The Australian Table Open, first held in 2007
- The Israeli Table Open, first held in 2007

== History ==
The first version of Tantrix was created by Mike McManaway in 1988 and was called Mind Game. It used 56 cardboard pieces with only two coloured lines, red and black. Owning a games shop, McManaway sold the game directly and following customer feedback continued to change the rules and design. In 1991, the tiles were changed to plastic and two more colours were added, allowing for four-player games.

The 16 possible tiles (necklaces) with the colours red, yellow and green – on the right the triple intersections, which were taken out of the game

The tiles were (and still are) hand-painted, featuring different colours to those now used, including pink. The early form of the game featured eight "triple intersections" (tiles with three lines connecting opposite edges), but these were found to slow the game play as they only fit into three different forced spaces (compared to six for all other tiles). So, in 1993, the triple intersections were removed from the game.

Along with the multiplayer version of the game, McManaway created smaller solitaire puzzles using 10 or 12 tiles that required the player to put the tiles together to create loops of certain colours.

McManaway has also created many solitaire puzzles, including 3-D versions, match only versions (requiring players to colour match tiles within a confined space) and loop and line versions (requiring players to use all the nominated tiles to complete a loop or line in a specific colour). However many of the editions are no longer available.

The main versions sold in most countries are:

1. Tantrix Discovery: A solo version, consisting of 10 tiles, where players attempt puzzles that take between 30 seconds and 45 minutes.
2. Tantrix Solitaire: A set of 14 tiles designed to play Tantrix Solitaire combined with expanded Tantrix Discovery puzzles.
3. Tantrix Match: Tantrix meets sudoku. A number of pre-placed clues controls the difficulty of each puzzle.
4. Tantrix Game Pack: A bag with all 56 Tantrix tiles, with which players can play all editions of Tantrix.

Tantrix got its first big contract in 1994 when Air France bought the game to give to children on its flights. In 2003 Tantrix was named Toy of the Year in Hungary and won the British National Association of Toy and Leisure Libraries gold award in the games category.

== Tileset ==
Tantrix Tiles
| Yellow-Red-Blue-(Green) | | | | Yellow-Red-(Blue)-Green | | | | (Yellow)-Red-Blue-Green | | | | Yellow-(Red)-Blue-Green | | | |
| No. | VN | Pattern | Image | No. | VN | Pattern | Image | No. | VN | Pattern | Image | No. | VN | Pattern | Image |
|---|---|---|---|---|---|---|---|---|---|---|---|---|---|---|---|
| 3 | 003 | abbcca YRRBBY | | 23 | 003 | abbcca GYYRRG | | | | | | | | | |
| | | | | 21 | 003 | baaccb YGGRRY | | | | | | | | | |
| | | | | 31 | 021 | accbab YGGRYR | | | | | | | | | |
| 1 | 021 | baacbc RYYBRB | | 17 | 021 | baacbc RYYGRG | | | | | | | | | |
| | | | | | | | | | | | | 52 | 021 | bccaba BGGYBY | |
| 12 | 021 | cbbaca BRRYBY | | 20 | 021 | cbbaca GRRYGY | | | | | | 56 | 021 | cbbaca GBBYGY | |
| 2 | 102 | caacbb BYYBRR | | 22 | 102 | caacbb GYYGRR | | | | | | | | | |
| | | | | | | | | | | | | 44 | 120 | abcacb YBGYGB | |
| 9 | 120 | bcabac RBYRYB | | | | | | | | | | 50 | 120 | bcabac BGYBYG | |
| | | | | | | | | 28 | 003 | abbcca RBBGGR | | | | | |
| | | | | | | | | 25 | 003 | baaccb BRRGGB | | | | | |
| 11 | 021 | abbcac YRRBYB | | 19 | 021 | abbcac YRRGYG | | | | | | 55 | 021 | abbcac YBBGYG | |
| | | | | | | | | 29 | 021 | baacbc BRRGBG | | 53 | 021 | baacbc BYYGBG | |
| 10 | 021 | caabcb BYYRBR | | 18 | 021 | caabcb GYYRGR | | 27 | 021 | caabcb GRRBGB | | 54 | 021 | caabcb GYYBGB | |
| | | | | 16 | 102 | abbacc YRRYGG | | 30 | 102 | abbacc RBBRGG | | | | | |
| 5 | 102 | bccbaa RBBRYY | | 15 | 102 | bccbaa RGGRYY | | 24 | 102 | bccbaa BGGBRR | | 48 | 102 | bccbaa BGGBYY | |
| | | | | | | | | 26 | 102 | caacbb GRRGBB | | 49 | 102 | caacbb GYYGBB | |
| 4 | 120 | cabcba BYRBRY | | | | | | | | | | 51 | 120 | cabcba GYBGBY | |
| 14 | 003 | baaccb RYYBBR | | | | | | | | | | 43 | 003 | baaccb BYYGGB | |
| 8 | 021 | accbab YBBRYR | | | | | | 41 | 021 | accbab RGGBRB | | | | | |
| 7 | 021 | bccaba RBBYRY | | | | | | | | | | | | | |
| 13 | 102 | abbacc YRRYBB | | | | | | | | | | | | | |
| 6 | 120 | abcacb YRBYBR | | | | | | 42 | 120 | abcacb RBGRGB | | | | | |
| | | | | | | | | 40 | 120 | bcabac BGRBRG | | | | | |
| | | | | | | | | 39 | 120 | cabcba GRBGBR | | | | | |
| | | | | | | | | | | | | 45 | 003 | abbcca YBBGGY | |
| | | | | | | | | 37 | 021 | abbcac RBBGRG | | | | | |
| | | | | | | | | | | | | 46 | 021 | accbab YGGBYB | |
| | | | | 33 | 021 | bccaba RGGYRY | | 36 | 021 | bccaba BGGRBR | | | | | |
| | | | | | | | | 38 | 021 | cbbaca GBBRGR | | | | | |
| | | | | | | | | | | | | 47 | 102 | abbacc YBBYGG | |
| | | | | 35 | 120 | abcacb YRGYGR | | | | | | | | | |
| | | | | 34 | 120 | bcabac RGYRYG | | | | | | | | | |
| | | | | 32 | 120 | cabcba GYRGRY | | | | | | | | | |
Triple intersections removed from the set
| 61 | 300 | abcabc YRBYRB | | 57 | 300 | abcabc YRGYRG | | 63 | 300 | abcabc RBGRBG | | 59 | 300 | abcabc YBGYBG | |
| 62 | 300 | acbacb YBRYBR | | 58 | 300 | acbacb YGRYGR | | 64 | 300 | acbacb RGBRGB | | 60 | 300 | acbacb YGBYGB | |

== See also ==
- Black Path Game
- List of world championships in mind sports
- Palago, a hexagonal tile game co-invented by Mike McManaway
- Serpentiles
- Trax, a connection game played with similar tiles but different gameplay
