= Trax (board game) =

Strategy game

- Trax tiles
- Designers: David Smith
- Publication: 1980
- Genres: abstract strategy, tile placement, connection game
- Players: 2
- Setup time: 1 minute
- Playing time: 30 minutes
- Chance: None
- Age range: 8+
- Skills: Strategy

Trax is a two-player abstract strategy game of loops and lines invented by David Smith in 1980.

The game is played with a set of identical square tiles. One side of the tile has red and white straight lines and the other red and white curves.

== History ==
Loops in Trax

Trax was invented in 1980 by David Smith, a chartered accountant in Christchurch, New Zealand. Smith published five games between 1970 and 1980, including Chess Cards, a variant of chess in which players could choose to either draw a card (with a chess piece printed on the obverse) or move a card already in play according to the revealed piece's rules. Chess Cards featured "boardless" play; once drawn, the card could be played onto any flat surface, subject to additional rules that would prevent playing the cards into isolation from the cards already in play. In November 1980, Smith began to develop the boardless aspect of Chess Cards with a more original, abstract game, which led to Trax. He quickly developed the idea of two coloured paths, but discovered that play could stop if three edges had the same colours, leading to his breakthrough invention of the forced-play rule, approximately one week later on November 26.

The game was first published in New Zealand and the United States in 1982. Originally, the tiles were made out of cardboard and were red with black and white lines. As the game became more popular, the tiles were changed to high-density plastic using the same colors. The change to black tiles with red and white lines took place in 2005.

In 1999, Microsoft Corporation selected Trax as one of the first proprietary games in its Internet Gaming Zone. For the 2015 International Conference on Field-Programmable Technology in Queenstown, New Zealand, Trax was selected for the design competition for implementation using a field programmable gate array processor.

The reigning world champion is Donald Bailey, an engineering professor at Massey University in New Zealand. As of 2018, with the exception of a loss in the 1994 final, he has won every Trax world championship since 1990.

== Gameplay ==
TRAX is a two-player game that does not have a defined playing board, but any flat surface is suitable. For the commercial boxed versions of the game, 64 identical square, double-sided tiles are included. On one side is the cross/straight paths, where the colors connect opposite sides, and on the other side is the curved paths, where the colors connect adjacent sides. Rotating the tile by 90 degrees yields six possible orientations:

- Straight side:
- Curved side:

By mutual agreement, the players select a colour for their path, with the player selecting the white path making the first move. The first tile to be played is either (curved tile with white running top–left and red running bottom–right) or (cross tile with white running top–bottom and red running left–right). Each successive move is made adjacent to a tile in play; the colours of the track on the newly-played tile must link to the track on the adjacent tile in play. For example, the following sequence is a legal series:

Move	Board						Notation	Player
1		@					@0/	White
1	0		0				@0/	White
1		@					@0/	White
2		@	A	B			B1+	Red
2	0				0		B1+	Red
2	1				1		B1+	Red
2	2				2		B1+	Red
2		@	A	B			B1+	Red
3		@	A	B	C		B2\	White
3	0					0	B2\	White
3	1					1	B2\	White
3	2					2	B2\	White
3		@	A	B	C		B2\	White
3(F)		@	A	B	C		(A2\)	White (forced play)
3(F)	0					0	(A2\)	White (forced play)
3(F)	1					1	(A2\)	White (forced play)
3(F)	2					2	(A2\)	White (forced play)
3(F)		@	A	B	C		(A2\)	White (forced play)

The objective is to get a loop or line of your colour while attempting to stop your opponent from completing a loop in their colour.

TRAX includes a forced-play rule. If a tile played in any turn forms an adjacent space or spaces into which same coloured track enters from two edges, that same player must play an additional tile into each such space so as to join up the same coloured track, be it white or red, as part of that turn. A forced play may itself require further forced plays to be made. A turn is not complete until the only remaining spaces are either single edged spaces or two edged spaces entered by tracks of both colours. In the three-move example above, note that the White path player created a forced move with the third tile played and the fourth tile extended the path of the Red player.

An illegal move is one that creates an adjacent space into which the same coloured track enters from more than two edges. The entire turn must be replayed from the initial tile.

=== Winning conditions ===
A player wins when they form a loop, which is a continuous closed path of the player's chosen color, or when they form a line, which is a continuous path of the player's chosen color that extends for at least 8 rows or columns from one edge of the board to the opposite edge. Examples of each condition are given below.

Loop (White wins)

Line (Red wins)

If the result of a single turn (including forced moves) is that both players meet the winning criteria simultaneously, the player whose turn it was is declared the winner.

=== Notation ===
TRAX tile type notation
Character	Tiles
+	
/	
\	

The turns in a game may be recorded in text format as a three-character code according to the position and type of the tile played. The first character denotes the column into which the tile was played, and the second character denotes the row. Columns are numbered successively from left to right as @, A, B, ..., Z, AA, AB, ..., AZ, BA, ... and rows are numbered successively from top to bottom as 0, 1, 2, 3, ... The third character denotes the type of tile played; symbols were chosen based on the general shape of the tracks. Crosses/straights are denoted by "+" and the curved tiles are denoted by the forward slash ("/") or backslash ("\") characters, which represent the direction of the diagonal of the corners between unconnected sides. The rotational orientation of the tile played is determined unambiguously by the tile(s) adjacent to where it was played, so the orientation of the tile played does not need to be specified using this nomenclature system. Similarly, the forced-play rule determines any additional tiles played during that turn, so the forced tiles do not need to be recorded.

However, because the first tile to be played determines the orientation (relative directions) of the game board, only two valid first moves are possible. The two valid first moves are:

- (denoted @0/ ), where the white track defines the top and left sides of the game board and the red track defines the bottom and right sides.
- (denoted @0+ ), where the white track defines the top and bottom of the game board and the red track defines the left and right sides.

The third possibility would be:

- (which would be denoted @0\ ) is not a valid first move. Since the white path on a curved tile defines the top and left sides, if the curved tile is played as the first move in this orientation, the playing field is rotated by 90° clock-wise and the move would still be recorded as @0/ .

In this notation system, because the @ column and 0 row are used for the leftmost empty column and topmost empty row, this "origin" point will change in the turn following a turn in which a tile was played (or forced) into the @ column or 0 row. For example, once the first move is made ( @0/ or @0+ ), that first tile becomes position A1 for the second turn, so if the second player plays a tile to the right of that first tile, the second move is recorded as B1+ , B1/ , or B1\ . The only legal moves for the second turn would be @1x (to the left), A0x (above), A2x (below), or B1x (to the right).

Prior to 1998, an alternative three-character notation system was used. The first two characters consist of a number and a letter, with the letter denoting the column (in order from left to right, A, B, C, ...) and the number denoting the row (in order from top to bottom, 1, 2, 3, ...). The third character is either S (when a straights/cross piece is played), C (when a curved piece is played as the first tile or against two edges), or U/D/L/R (depending on the track which being continued, either Up, Down, Left, or Right, respectively). The sequence of the first two characters are reversed when the tile is played above the tile in the top left corner, so for example A1x is played to the left of the tile in the top-left corner, while 1Ax is played above that tile.

=== Variations ===
"Loop Trax" is a variant where the winning criterion is limited to closed loops only. Other variations include limiting playing board size (to 8×8, as "Limited Tiles" or 3×3, as "Mini Trax"). Originally, the game was limited to an 8×8 board because each set was supplied with 64 tiles; the variant "SuperTrax", which removed the size limits, required the purchase of at least one additional set. With the advent of virtual play, "SuperTrax" has become the dominant variant.

== Example game ==
After move 31, Bailey (White) / Siegenthaler (Black) 1994
	@	A	B	C	D	E	F	G	H	I	J	K
0													0
1													1
2													2
3													3
4													4
5													5
6													6
7													7
8													8
9													9
10													10
11													11
12													12
13													13
	@	A	B	C	D	E	F	G	H	I	J	K

This game was played between Donald Bailey (white) and Tom Seigenthaler (black) in early 1994. The cross/straights tile placed during the first move (as @0+ ) ended up in the final position of "C7".

1. @0+
2. @1\
3. B2\
4. A2+
5. B0/
6. C3\
7. D3+
8. A4+
9. @2+
10. C0/
11. F2+
12. G2\
13. C0+
14. D7\
15. E7\
16. E1+
17. F7\
18. F8\
19. E0/
20. E0/
21. H5+
22. G2+
23. F0/
24. G1+
25. I6\
26. H3\
27. H7+
28. J7+
29. C12/
30. B10+
31. H12\
32. Resign

== Reviews ==
- Games #32
- 1982 Games 100 in Games

== See also ==
- Tantrix, a connection game played with similar tiles but different gameplay
- Black Path Game
