= Pie rule =

Rule for balancing a game with an advantage when going first

A chess game using the pie rule, player 2's options in bold
Player 1 plays first move as White

Player 1

Position: a8 white rook, b8 white knight, c8 white bishop, d8 white king, e8 white queen, f8 white bishop, h8 white rook, a7 white pawn, b7 white pawn, c7 white pawn, d7 white pawn, e7 white pawn, f7 white pawn, g7 white pawn, h7 white pawn, f6 white knight, a2 black pawn, b2 black pawn, c2 black pawn, d2 black pawn, e2 black pawn, f2 black pawn, g2 black pawn, h2 black pawn, a1 black rook, b1 black knight, c1 black bishop, d1 black king, e1 black queen, f1 black bishop, g1 black knight, h1 black rook

Player 2

↙
↘
**Player 2**
**lets move stand**
**Player 2**
**switches places**

Player 1

Position: a8 white rook, b8 white knight, c8 white bishop, d8 white king, e8 white queen, f8 white bishop, h8 white rook, a7 white pawn, b7 white pawn, c7 white pawn, d7 white pawn, e7 white pawn, f7 white pawn, g7 white pawn, h7 white pawn, f6 white knight, a2 black pawn, b2 black pawn, c2 black pawn, d2 black pawn, e2 black pawn, f2 black pawn, g2 black pawn, h2 black pawn, a1 black rook, b1 black knight, c1 black bishop, d1 black king, e1 black queen, f1 black bishop, g1 black knight, h1 black rook

Player 2

Player 1

Position: a8 black rook, b8 black knight, c8 black bishop, d8 black queen, e8 black king, f8 black bishop, g8 black knight, h8 black rook, a7 black pawn, b7 black pawn, c7 black pawn, d7 black pawn, e7 black pawn, f7 black pawn, g7 black pawn, h7 black pawn, c3 white knight, a2 white pawn, b2 white pawn, c2 white pawn, d2 white pawn, e2 white pawn, f2 white pawn, g2 white pawn, h2 white pawn, a1 white rook, c1 white bishop, d1 white queen, e1 white king, f1 white bishop, g1 white knight, h1 white rook

Player 2

Player 2 to play
as Black, as before
Player 1 to play again,
now as Black

The pie rule, sometimes referred to as the swap rule, is a rule used to balance abstract strategy games where a first-move advantage has been demonstrated. After the first move is made in a game that uses the pie rule, the second player must select one of two options:

1. Letting the move stand. The second player remains the second player and moves immediately.
2. Switching places. The second player becomes the first-moving player with the move already done by the opponent, and the opponent plays the first move of their new color.

Depending on the game, there may be two ways to implement switching places.

1. Switching colors means that the players exchange pieces. The player who made the first move becomes the second player and makes the second move on the board. This is demonstrated in the chess diagrams shown here.
2. Switching the first piece can occur in games where the board starts empty and the first move consists of placing one piece. Suppose the colors are white versus black, and black places the first piece. This piece is replaced by a white piece in the corresponding location for white, and the black piece is returned to black's supply. In a game such as Hex or TwixT, the corresponding location is at a cell "reflected" across the nearest (or either) diagonal. In games such as Y, where the board is not directional, the white stone replaces the black stone in the same cell. Players keep their respective color pieces, and play continues with black making the next move. This is effectively the same as switching colors.

The use of pie rule was first reported in 1909 for a game in the Mancala family. Among modern games, Hex uses this rule. TwixT in tournament play uses a swap rule. In Meridians, the first player places 2 stones on the board before the second player chooses the color. The rule can be applied to other games which are otherwise solved for one player, such as Gomoku or Tablut.

The rule gets its name from the divide and choose method of ensuring fairness in when dividing a pie between two people: one person cuts the pie in half, then the other person chooses which half to eat. The person cutting the pie, knowing that the other person will choose the larger piece, will make as equal a division as possible.

This rule acts as a normalization factor in games where there may be a first-move advantage. In games that cannot end in a draw, such as Hex, the pie rule theoretically gives the second player a win (since one of the players must have a winning strategy after the first move, and the second player can choose to be this player), but the practical result is that the first player will choose a move neither too strong nor too weak, and the second player will have to decide whether switching places is worth the first-move advantage.

== Use for determining komi in Go ==
In Go, one player can choose the amount of komi. (These are the points given to the second player as compensation for not going first.) The other player then decides whether to accept that or switch colors with the other player. This leads players to choose fair komi amounts because if they choose a komi that is too advantageous, the other player can just choose to play White and take advantage of that high komi.
