= Astar (game) =

Two-player abstract strategy board game from Kyrgyzstan

Astar is a two-player abstract strategy board game from Kyrgyzstan. It is a game similar to draughts and Alquerque as players hop over one another's pieces when capturing. However, unlike draughts and Alquerque, Astar is played on 5×6 square grid with two triangular boards attached on two opposite sides of the grid. The board somewhat resembles those of kotu ellima, sixteen soldiers, and peralikatuma, all of which are games related to astar. However, these three games use an expanded alquerque board with a 5×5 square grid with diagonal lines. Astar uses a 5×6 grid with no diagonal lines.

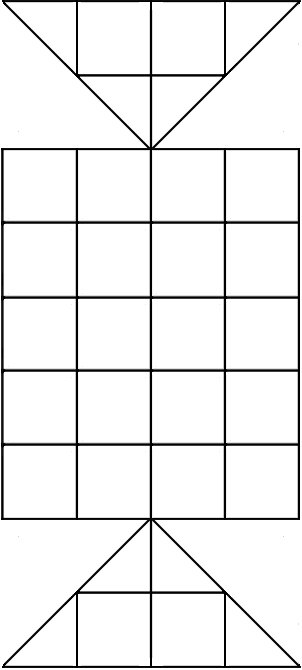
Astar board

== Goal ==
The player that captures all of their opponent's pieces wins. Alternatively, the player that fully occupies their opponent's triangular board wins. Another way to win is if a player can trap their opponent's pieces and thus preventing them from performing a legal move.

== Equipment ==
A 5x6 square grid is used with a triangular board attached on two opposite sides of the square grid specifically on the two shorter sides of the square grid. The square grid only consist of orthogonal lines; there are no diagonal lines.

Each player has 16 pieces of which one set is black, and the other is white.

== Game play and rules ==
1. Players decide who will play the black pieces, and who will play the white pieces. They also decide who will start first.

2. Players play opposite one another across the board with each player having its own triangular board. Players place all of their 16 pieces in the first four ranks of their side of the board. Therefore, each player's triangular board will be filled up with their own pieces, and on the fourth rank, the three middle intersection points are occupied.

3. On a player's turn, a piece may move (in any orthogonal direction) along a marked line onto a vacant adjacent intersection point. Alternatively, a player's piece may capture an enemy piece. The player's piece must be orthogonally adjacent to the enemy piece. The player's piece leaps over it (as in draughts), and lands on a vacant point immediately beyond. The leap must be in a straight line, and follow the pattern on the board. If possible, the piece can continue to capture in any (orthogonal) direction. It is uncertain whether captures are compulsory, but in games like kotu ellima, sixteen soldiers, and peralikatuma, captures are compulsory. The same may be true for astar. Since captures may be compulsory, a player's piece must continue to leap and capture enemy pieces until it can no longer do so. Captured piece(s) are removed from the board.

4. Only one piece may be moved or used to capture enemy piece(s) in a turn.

5. If a player has more than one option to capture, then the player can choose any one (and only one) of them.

== Related games ==
- Kotu Ellima
- Sixteen soldiers
- Peralikatuma
- Terhuchu
- Permainan-Tabal
