= Traditional games of Sri Lanka =

Traditional Sri Lankan games

Sri Lanka has several traditional games and sports, many of which are played during the Aluth Avurudda festival. Some of these games are similar to other traditional South Asian games.

== Traditional games ==
=== Ankeliya ===
In Ankeliya, two horns are attached to a strong tree, and then a rope is thrown across both horns. Two teams tug at the opposite ends of the rope until one of the horns breaks off.

=== Batta ===
Batta is a form of hopscotch in which players must hop through various boxes while moving a stone forward through the boxes. Stepping on the ground with a disallowed foot, stepping on the lines between the boxes, or moving the stone into a disallowed area causes a player to lose.

=== Elle ===
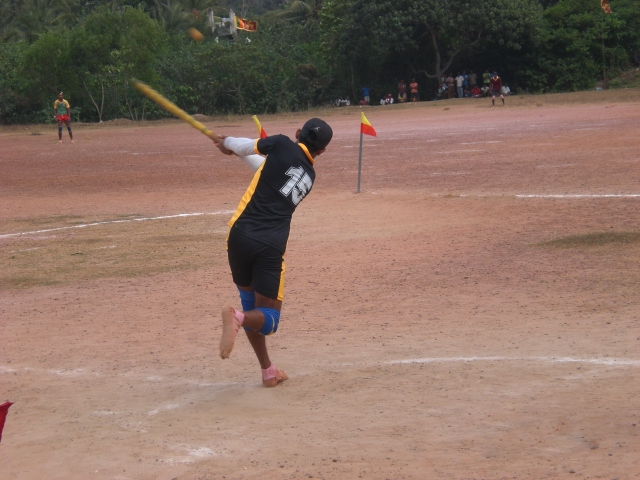
Elle player hitting the ball

Elle is a popular bat-and-ball game in Sri Lanka which is also a localised name for slow-pitch softball, often played in rural villages and urban areas. From modern-day sports popular around the world, elle has the most similarities with softball.

=== Gudu keliya ===
Gudu keliya is a variation of gilli-danda in which one player attempts to knock a small stick on the ground up into the air by hitting it with a longer stick held in the hand, and then tries to hit the small stick as far as possible. Opponents can catch the small stick before it touches the ground to make the hitter lose.

=== Kotta Pora ===
Kotta Pora is a pillow-fighting game in which two opponents sit on top of a pole which is balanced off the ground. Both players must keep one hand behind their back and, using a pillow held with the other hand, attempt to knock the opponent off the pole.

=== Kana Mutti Bindima ===
Players must attempt to break water-filled pots that are suspended off the ground with a stick while blindfolded.

=== Porapol gaseema ===
In this game, the players of two teams throw coconuts at each other, and use their own coconuts to block the coconuts thrown at them. As the game progresses, some of the coconuts eventually break, and by the end of the game, the team with the most intact coconuts wins.

== Variations of tag ==
=== Chak-gudu ===
Chak-gudu is a variation of kabaddi.

=== Kili Thadthu ===
Kili Thadthu (related to the Tamil game of Killithattu) is a game in which two teams of six players compete in periods of seven minutes, with the teams alternating offense and defense in each period. To score, the attacking team's players must make it across the entire field without being tagged by the defensive players, who stand on lines drawn horizontally across the field.

== Martial arts ==
=== Cheena di ===
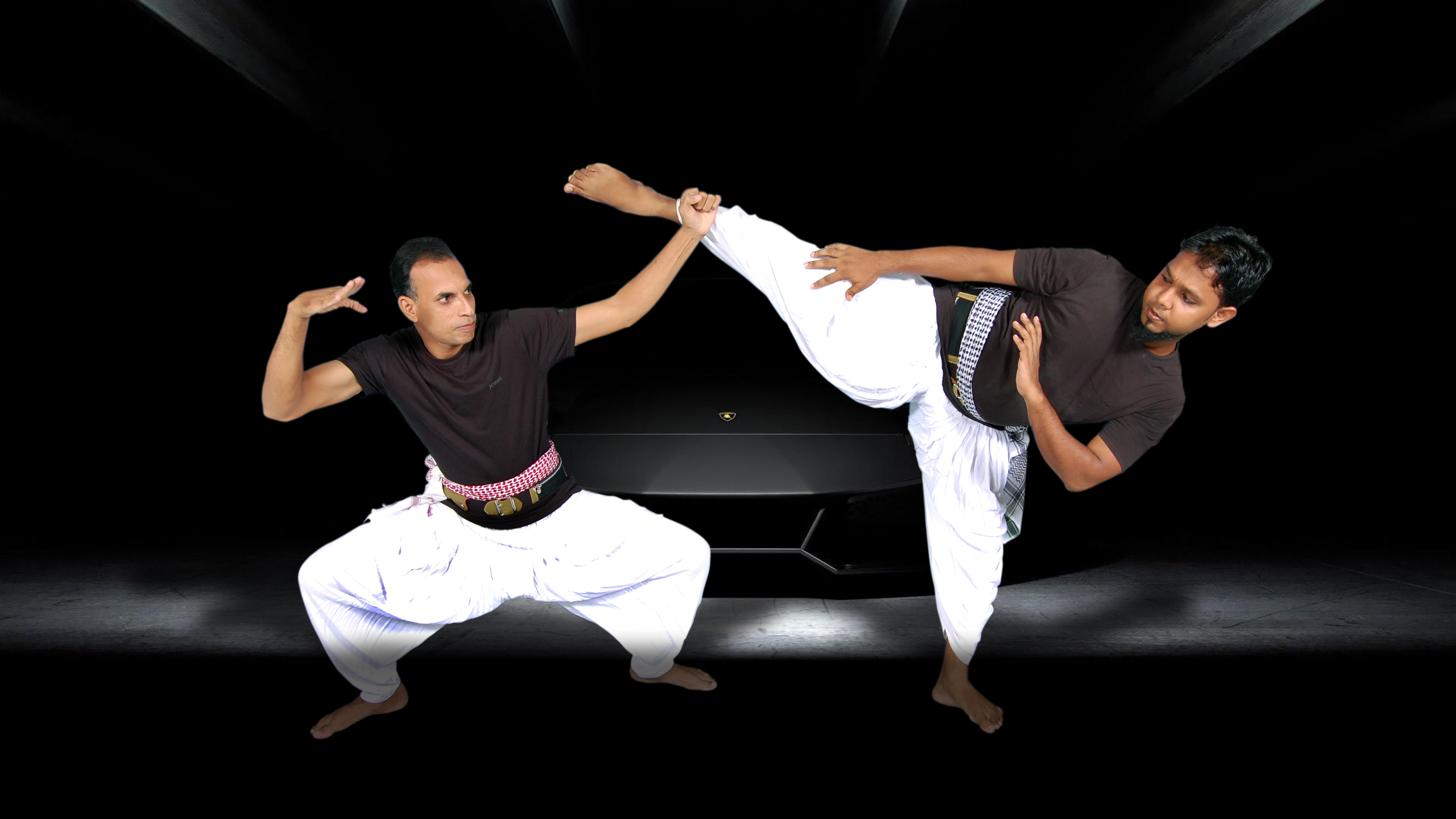

Cheena di (lit. 'Chinese stepping method or Chinese fist/punch', former in contemporary Sinhalese), or Cheenaadi, or occasionally, Chinna ati / Chaina pudi; and in Malayalam Cheena Adi, is a Chinese-derived martial art in Sri Lanka. Another viewpoint, due to self-proclaimed Cheena di Master Gunadasa Subasinghe is that the word Cheena di comes from Chennai (A)di, a martial art originally taught by Indian Immigrants in Sri Lanka (called "Kallathoni", the people who came to the island illegally in fishing boats from coastal South India and settled in the Southern parts of the island rather than in the Tamil predominant North) to their eventually street-fighting disciples called Chandi (lit. 'Rascals or Goons', in contemporary Sinhalese) of diverse native ethnicities, including the Sinhalese, Muslims, as well as Sri Lanka Tamils, all living in the same poor-ish neighbourhoods.

=== Angampora ===
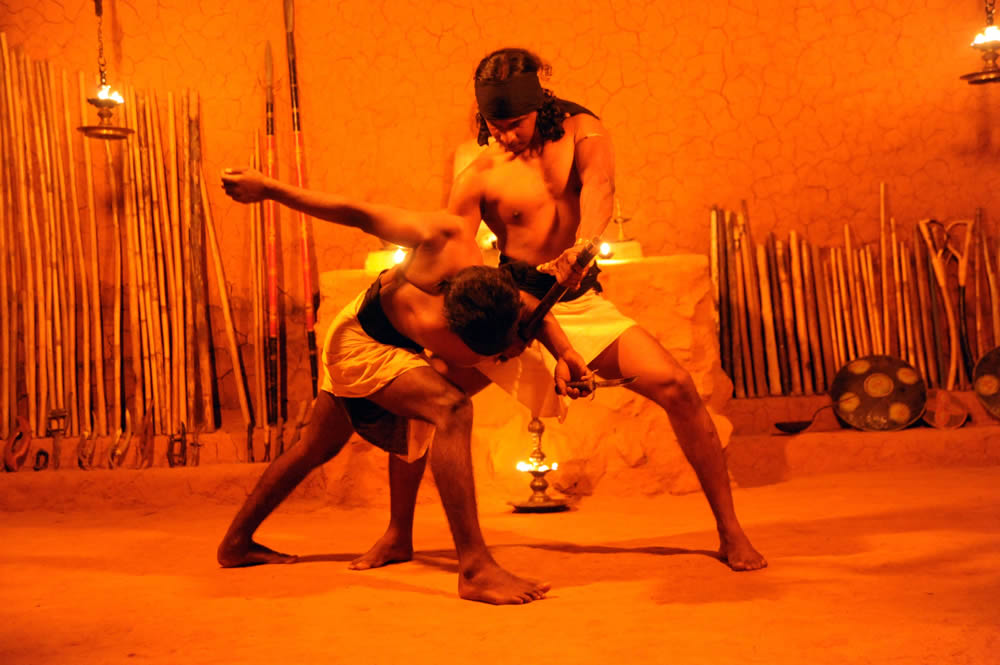

Angampora is a Sinhalese martial art that combines combat techniques, self-defense, sport, exercise, and meditation. A key component of angampora is the namesake angam, which incorporates hand-to-hand fighting, and illangam, involving the use of indigenous weapons such as the ethunu kaduwa, staves, knives and swords. Another component known as maya angam, which uses spells and incantations for combat, is also said to have existed. Angampora's distinct feature lies in the use of pressure point attacks to inflict pain or permanently paralyze the opponent. Fighters usually make use of both striking and grappling techniques, and fight until the opponent is caught in a submission lock that they cannot escape. Usage of weapons is discretionary. Perimeters of fighting are defined in advance, and in some of the cases is a pit.

A number of paintings related to angampora are found at Buddhist temples in Sri Lanka. These include Embekka Devalaya, Gadaladeniya Rajamaha Viharaya, Temple of the Tooth, Saman Devalaya (Ratnapura) and Lankathilaka Rajamaha Viharaya.

== Board games ==
=== Olinda keliya ===
Olinda keliya is a form of mancala.

=== Peralikatuma ===
Peralikatuma

Peralikatuma is a two-player abstract strategy board game from Sri Lanka (formerly called Ceylon). It is a game related to draughts (checkers) and alquerque as players hop over one another's pieces when capturing them. The game was documented by Henry Parker in Ancient Ceylon: An Account of the Aborigines and of Part of the Early Civilisation (1909) with the name perali kotuwa or the war enclosure. Parker mentions that it is also played in India. It closely resembles another game from Sri Lanka called Kotu Ellima. The two games use the same board which consist of a standard alquerque board but with four triangular boards attach to its four sides. The only difference between the two games is in the number of pieces. In peralikatuma, each player has 23 pieces. In Kotu Ellima, each player has 24 pieces.

The game is also spelled as perali kotuma.
