= Fetaix =

Board game

Fetaix is a two-player abstract strategy board game from Morocco. It is very similar to Alquerque. The only difference is that pieces cannot move backwards until they are promoted to Mullah which is the equivalent of King in draughts. Furthermore, Mullahs can move any number of vacant points on the board, and capture enemy pieces from any distance similar to the Kings in International draughts. Another name for the game is qireq.

== Goal ==
The player who captures all of their opponent's pieces is the winner.

== Equipment ==
The board used is an Alquerque board. Each player has 12 pieces as in Alquerque. One player plays the black pieces, and the other player plays the white pieces.

== Game Play and Rules ==
1. Players decide what color pieces to play.

2. The board is initially set up exactly as in Alquerque. Each player's pieces are set up in the first two ranks (two rows) of their side, and also on the two right-most points of the third rank (center row of the board). The only point vacant on the board is the middle point.

3. Players alternate their turns. A player on their turn may either move one of their pieces, or use one of their pieces to capture the other player's piece(s).

4. A piece can only move one space onto a vacant point forward (straight forward, diagonally forward) or sideways (left and right) following the pattern on the board until promoted to Mullah.

Mullahs can move in any direction following the pattern on the board. Mullahs can also move any number of vacant points in a straight line.

5. A non-Mullah piece may capture an enemy piece by the short leap method. The non-Mullah piece leaps over the adjacent enemy piece in a straight line following the pattern on the board, and landing on a vacant point on the other side. Captures are compulsory. Captured pieces are removed from the board. Multiple captures are allowed and must be taken if possible, and provided there exist exactly one vacant point in between the enemy pieces, and a vacant point beyond. It is unknown, however, if non-Mullah pieces can capture in the backward direction (straight back or diagonally back).

Mullahs can capture in any direction. They can also capture enemy pieces from any distance, and land any distance beyond provided there is no other pieces (friendly or not) within the path of the (straight) leap. Mullahs are also capable of multiple captures. Captures are compulsory for Mullahs.

6. A non-Mullah piece is promoted to Mullah when it reaches the last rank (the other player's first rank or row). It is uncertain whether a piece can be promoted to Mullah when it reaches the last rank as one of its intermediary steps of a capturing sequence.

== Related Games ==
- Alquerque
- Kharbaga
- Zamma
- Meurimueng-rimueng peuet ploh
