= Gol-skuish =

The Gol-skuish board with stones in the starting positions

Gol-skuish is a two-player abstract strategy game from India, specifically from Central Provinces, and it was described by H.J.R. Murray in A History of Board-Games Other Than Chess (1952). The game belongs to the draughts and Alquerque family as pieces are captured by leaping over them. The board is composed of seven concentric circles divided by three diameters. Gol-skuish belongs to a specific category of games called Indian War-games which include Lau kata kati, Dash-guti, Egara-guti, and Pretwa. At the beginning of every Indian War-game all the pieces are laid out on the board at every intersection point, with the exception of the central point. This forces the first move of the game to be played on the central point, and captured by the second player's piece.

Gol-skuish is a larger version of the game Pretwa.

== Setup ==
The board consist of seven concentric circles divided by three diameters which are equally spaced apart from one another (see diagram). This produces 43 intersection points (henceforth called "points"). The three diameters intersect to form the central point of the board. Pieces are situated on the points, and move and capture along the lines of the board.

Each player has 21 pieces. One plays the black pieces, and the other plays the white pieces, however any two colors or distinguishable objects will do. Players choose which color to play, and who starts first.

As indicated by the diagram, each player initially places their 21 pieces on three consecutive radiuses leaving the central point vacant.

== Rules ==
- Players alternate their turns using one piece to either move or capture exclusively per turn.
- A piece moves one space per turn onto a vacant adjacent point along a line.
- Captures are compulsory and are done by the short leap as in draughts and Alquerque. A player's piece leaps over an adjacent enemy piece and lands onto a vacant point adjacently behind. A capture of an enemy piece must be completed exclusively along a concentric circle, or along a diametrical line. A piece must continue to capture if it is able to do so, and can switch from capturing along a concentric line to a diameter and vice versa. Captured pieces are removed from the board immediately.
- If a player captures all of their opponent's pieces or at least reduces their numbers to five, he or she is the winner.
- If a player cannot perform a move or a capture because its pieces have been blocked or immobilized by the other player's pieces, this is known as a stalemate, and the player loses; the other player wins.
- If neither player can capture any more pieces, then the player with more pieces wins. If both players have the same number of pieces, then the game is a draw.

== Related Games ==
Pretwa, Lau kata kati, Dash-guti, Egara-guti, Butterfly (game), Draughts, Alquerque
