= Butterfly (game) =

Butterfly (or Gulugufe in the Tonga language of Zambia, Malawi and Mozambique) is a two-player abstract strategy game. It is related to draughts and Alquerque. It is a similar game to Lau kata kati from India which may suggest a historical connection between the two games.

== Goal ==
The goal is to capture all of your opponent's pieces.

== Equipment ==
Butterfly game (initial position)

The board is essentially two triangles joined together at a common vertex which makes the board look like a butterfly. Each triangle will be referred to as a wing in this article. Two lines cross the breadth of each triangle forming the second and third ranks, and another line that runs down the length of the triangle through the common vertex. There are a total of 19 intersection points for the pieces to be played upon.

Each player has nine pieces. One player plays black, and the other player plays white; however, any two colors or distinguishable objects will suffice.

== Related games ==
- Lau kata kati
- Dash-guti
- Egara-guti
- Permainan-Tabal
- Peralikatuma
- Draughts
