= Egara-guti =

Egara-guti is a two-player abstract strategy game from India, specifically from Central Provinces, which was described by H.J.R. Murray in A History of Board-Games Other Than Chess (1952). The game is related to Draughts and even more so to Alquerque. Pieces are captured by leaping over them. Egara-Guti consists of a Lau kata kati board, but with the addition of two lines connecting the two triangles and running through them. Egara-guti belongs to a specific category of games called Indian War-games; some other games in this category are Lau kata kati, Dash-guti, Pretwa, Gol-skuish. All Indian War-games have one important thing in common, and that is that all the pieces are laid out on the grid patterned board in the beginning, with only one vacant point in the center. This forces the first move to be played on the central point, and captured by the other player's piece.

== Setup ==
Game board and starting position

The board consist of two triangles connected together at a common vertex. Players play on opposite sides of the board with the base of each triangle forming the first rank of each player. Two lines cross the breadth of each triangle forming the second and third ranks respectively of each player. The common vertex is the fourth rank of each player, and is also the central point of the board. A single line perpendicular to the base of each triangle runs through the common vertex. Two more lines connect the two triangles where the second ranks intersect with their respective triangles and extend all the way to each triangle's base. There are a total of 23 intersection points. Pieces are situated on the intersection points, and move along the lines.

Each player has 11 pieces. One plays the black pieces, and the other plays the white pieces, however any two colors or distinguishable objects will do.

Players choose which color to play, and who starts first.

The 11 black pieces are initially placed on the intersection points of one of the triangles, and the 11 white pieces are placed on the intersection points of the other triangle. The only intersection point vacant is the central point of the board.

Intersection points henceforth will be referred to as "points".

== Rules ==
- Players alternate their turns using one piece to either move or capture exclusively per turn.
- A piece moves one space per turn onto a vacant adjacent point along a line.
- Captures are compulsory and are done by the short leap as in draughts and Alquerque, where the adjacent enemy piece is leaped over onto a vacant point adjacently behind. The captures must be done in a straight line following the pattern on the board. A piece must continue to capture if it is able to. Captured pieces are removed immediately from the board.
- If a player captures all of their opponent's pieces, he or she is the winner.
- If a player cannot perform a move or a capture because its pieces have been blocked or immobilized by the other player's pieces, this is known as a stalemate, and the player loses; the other player wins.
- If neither player can capture any more pieces, the player with most pieces wins. If both players have the same number of pieces, then the game is a draw.

== Cultural references ==
Handcraft society Ramsons Kala Pratishtana included Egara Guti in its exhibition of traditional games.

== Related games ==
- Lau kata kati
- Dash-guti
- Butterfly
- Pretwa
- Gol-skuish
- Draughts
- Alquerque
