= Tukvnanawopi =

Tûkvnanawöpi is a two-player abstract strategy board game played by the Hopi native American Indians of Arizona, United States. The game was traditionally played on a slab of stone, and the board pattern etched on it. Tukvnanawopi resembles draughts and Alquerque. Each player attempts to capture each other's pieces by hopping over them. It is unknown how old the game is; however, the game was published as early as 1907 in Stewart Culin's book "Games of the North American Indians Volume 2: Games of Skill".

A similar game (with a similar name) also played by the Hopi is Tuknanavuhpi. The only difference is that in Tuknanavuhpi lines of intersection points become unplayable as opposed to rows or columns of squares in Tukvnanawopi when the game progresses. Rule #7 under the Game Play and Rules section elaborates on this. Another similar game is played by the Keres native American tribe in New Mexico called Aiyawatstani. Lastly, the game is also similar to Kharbaga from Africa which may suggest a historical connection.

== Goal ==
The player who captures all of their opponent's pieces wins.

== Equipment ==
A 4x4 square board is used. Left and right leaning diagonal lines run through each square. This accounts for 41 intersection points. Each player has 20 pieces called "pokmoita" which means animals. One set of 20 pieces may be black, and the other set of 20 pieces may be white.

== Game Play and Rules ==
1. Players decide who will start first, and which among them will play the black and white pieces.

2. Each player's 20 pieces are set up on their half of the board on the intersection points including the middle (5th.) rank specifically the two intersection points to the left of the middle point. The middle point is the only intersection point left vacant in the beginning.

3. Players alternate their turns. A player may only use one of their own pieces to either move or capture.

4. On a player's turn, a piece may be moved in any direction along a line onto an adjacent intersection point that is vacant. In the beginning, the first player must bring a piece to the middle point as it is the only vacant intersection point.

5. Alternatively, a player may use a piece to capture an adjacent enemy piece by leaping over it, as in draughts and Alquerque, and landing on a vacant point immediately beyond. A player can leap an enemy piece from any direction. The leap must be in a straight line and follow the pattern on the board.

6. It is uncertain if captures are compulsory, and whether multiple leaps and captures are allowed since no source specifically mentions it.

7. When a row or column of squares on one end of the board becomes empty during the course of the game, pieces can no longer be played in that row or column of squares. It is uncertain, however, if the points on the line between the rows or columns of squares can be played upon when one of the rows or columns is empty and unplayable

8. As the game progresses, another row or column of squares on one end of the board will eventually become empty, and therefore unplayable. The playing area of the board continues to shrink during the course of the game.

== See also ==
- Tuknanavuhpi
- Aiyawatstani
- Kharbaga
- Draughts
- Alquerque
