= Dash-guti =

Indian board game

Dash-guti is a two-player abstract strategy board game from India, specifically from Central Provinces, United Provinces, Karwi Subdivision where it is called Kowwu Dunki which is the same name given to another similar game called Lau kata kati, and it was described by H.J.R. Murray in A History of Board-Games Other Than Chess (1952). The game is related to Draughts and even more so to Alquerque. Pieces are captured by leaping over them. Dash-guti consists of a Lau kata kati board, but with the addition of two line segments connected to the vertex (one on each side) but exterior to both triangles. Dash-guti belongs to a specific category of games called Indian War-games, and the other games in this category are Lau kata kati, Egara-guti, Pretwa, Gol-skuish. All Indian War-games have one important thing in common, and that is that all the pieces are laid out on the grid patterned board, with only one vacant point in the centre. This forces the first move to be played on the central point, and captured by the other player's piece.

== Setup ==
Game board and starting position

The board consist of two triangles connected together at a common vertex. Players play on opposite sides of the board with the base of each triangle forming the first rank of each player. Two lines cross the breadth of each triangle forming the second and third ranks respectively of each player. The common vertex and two line segments one on each side of the common vertex but exterior to both triangles form the fourth rank of each player. The common vertex is also the central point of the board. A single line perpendicular to the base of each triangle runs through the common vertex. There are a total of 19 intersection points and 2 endpoints (both henceforth referred to as "points") for a total of 21 points. Pieces are situated on the points, and move along the lines.

Each player has 10 pieces. One plays the black pieces, and the other plays the white pieces, however any two colors or distinguishable objects will do.

Players choose which color to play, and who starts first.

Players place their 10 pieces on their first four ranks. On the fourth rank, the central point is left vacant and a black piece and white piece occupy either side of it.

Dash-guti game:

- Players alternate their turns using one piece to either move or capture exclusively per turn.
- A piece moves one space per turn onto a vacant adjacent point along a line.
- Captures are compulsory and are done by the short leap as in draughts and Alquerque, where the adjacent enemy piece is leaped over onto a vacant point adjacently behind. The captures must be done in a straight line following the pattern on the board. A piece must continue to capture if it is able to. Captured pieces are removed immediately from the board.
- If a player captures all of their opponent's pieces, he or she is the winner.
- If a player cannot perform a move or a capture because its pieces have been blocked or immobilized by the other player's pieces, this is known as a stalemate, and the player loses; the other player wins.
- If neither player can capture anymore pieces, the player with more pieces wins. If both players have the same number of pieces, then the game is a draw.

== Related games ==
- Lau kata kati
- Butterfly
- Egara-guti
- Pretwa
- Gol-skuish
- Draughts
- Alquerque
