= Terhüchü =

- Genres: Board game Abstract strategy game Mind sport
- Players: 2
- Skills: Strategy, tactics

Terhüchü is a two-player abstract strategy board game from Nagaland in Northeast India and is played by the Angami Naga ethnic group.

The game was documented as Terhüchü by John Henry Hutton in The Angami Nagas, With Some Notes on Neighboring Tribes (1921). According to Hutton, Terhüchü means "Fighting-eating" because the two opposing pieces are fighting and eating each other. There are a few variations of the game under the term Terhüchü, and all of them are similar to draughts and alquerque as players hop over one another's pieces to capture them; they are most similar to alquerque as a standard alquerque board is used instead of a checkered square board, and in one variant eight triangular board sections are attached to the four sides (specifically to the middle vertex of each side) and the four corner vertices of the alquerque board. Each triangular board section is a triangle that is cross-sliced yielding an additional 48 intersections or vertices (or "points") to the 25 points of the standard Alquerque board which yields a total of 73 points on the board. Each triangle is adjoined to the alquerque board at one of its three vertices. Each triangle is cross-sliced in such a way that a line segment is drawn from the adjoining vertex to the base of the triangle with the other line segment drawn across the breadth of the triangle. As in alquerque, pieces can move and capture in any available direction at any time during the game following the pattern of the board.

Hutton describes three variants that are termed Terhüchü. The first two use a standard alquerque board only. The first variant has each player having 10 pieces (this is in contrast with standard alquerque which has 12 pieces for each player) with each player's pieces distinguishable from the other player. At the beginning of the game, the 10 pieces are placed on the first two ranks of each player's side of the board thus occupying all 10 points of the first two ranks. The second variant has each player having 8 pieces, and they also occupy the first two ranks of each player's side of the board, but on the second rank the two outermost points are left empty. For the third variant (with the eight additional triangular board sections attached to a standard alquerque board) each player has 9 pieces; the first rank of the alquerque board has 5 pieces and the second rank has 3 pieces leaving the two outermost points empty (as in the second variant previously described), and the remaining piece is placed inside one of the triangular board sections nearest the player diagonally adjacent to the left of the adjoining vertex.

All variations termed Terhüchü follow the following rules with exceptions noted for the variant with the additional eight triangular boards.

== Rules ==
- Players alternate their turns.
- A player may only use one of their pieces in a turn, and must either make a move or perform a capture but not both.
- A piece may be moved to a vacant adjacent point along a line. (Note: The piece may also move in any direction provided it is available unlike in most variants of draughts where pieces are initially restricted to the forward direction)
- A piece may capture an opposing piece by the short leap as in draughts or alquerque. The piece must be adjacent to the opposing piece, and leap over it onto a vacant point immediately beyond. The leap must be in a straight line and follow the pattern on the board. The captured piece is removed from the board. (Note: It is unknown if the same piece can continue to capture within the same turn since Hutton does not mention it. Nor does he mention about captures being obligatory.)
- The player who captures all of the other player's pieces wins.
- This rule only applies to the variant of Terhüchü with eight additional triangular boards. Hutton writes "Inside these corners the piece may skip one junction of lines and move straight to the next but one." The rule is a bit vague especially the portion "...but one". But the rule may mean that a piece may move two points in a turn thus skipping the point ("one junction" as Hutton writes it) inbetween; Hutton does not mention if such a move can be performed if there is a friendly or opposing piece on the point to be skipped over. This type of move must be completed completely within the triangular board it seems.

== Variants ==
Terhüchü is related to sixteen soldiers, peralikatuma, and Kotu Ellima which are also from the Indian subcontinent.

Another Naga people called the Sümi Naga have a very similar game that was documented as the war game by John Henry Hutton (the same person who documented Terhüchü) in The Sema Nagas (1921). The Sümi Naga are also from the state of Nagaland of Northeast India. The Sümis were referred to as Sema in the past. Hutton provides no indigenous name for the game, or an explanation for the lack of one. The game is very similar to Terhüchü (especially the first two variants described above) and alquerque with only one obvious difference. It uses a standard alquerque board, but with each player only having 11 pieces. In the beginning of the game, the pieces are placed similarly to that of alquerque except only one piece from each player occupies the middle row (also known as the common third rank of each player) and they are placed on the outermost points leaving three vacant points at the beginning of the game.
