= Kotu Ellima =

Sinhalese board game

Kotu Ellima is a two-player abstract strategy board game from Sri Lanka (formerly called Ceylon) played by the Sinhalese people. The game was documented by Henry Parker in Ancient Ceylon: An Account of the Aborigines and of Part of the Early Civilisation (1909); the game was printed as "Kotu Ellima" which is actually a misspelling because his source for the game was Leopold Ludovici's Journal of the Ceylon Branch of the Royal Asiatic Society (1873), and specifically in the chapter entitled "The Sports and Games of the Singhalese", and Ludovici wrote the name of the game as Kotu Ellime or Taking of the Castles. (Note: Singhalese is an archaic spelling of Sinhalese) (Note: Taking of the Castles may not be an actual Sinhalese-to-English translation of Kotu Ellime. Kotu may not actually be a Sinhalese word, but a close Sinhalese word is koti which means tiger. But Kotu may actually be an arachaic spelling of the Tamil word for castle which is Kōṭṭai. The Tamils are also an ethnolinguistic group inhabiting Sri Lanka. It's unsure what ellime may actually mean in English.) The game is similar to draughts (checkers) and Alquerque as players hop over one another's pieces to capture them; it is more similar to Alquerque between the two since it uses a standard Alquerque board. However, unlike draughts and standard Alquerque, the game is played on an expanded Alquerque board consisting of four triangular boards attached to the four sides of a standard Alquerque board. It closely resembles peralikatuma and sixteen soldiers (or sholo guti) which are also played in Sri Lanka and other parts of the Indian subcontinent with the only difference being the number of pieces. In sixteen soldiers, each player has 16 pieces hence the name of the game. In peralikatuma, each player has 23 pieces. In Kotu Ellima, each player has 24 pieces, and at the beginning of the game the whole board is covered with them except the central point reminiscent of standard alquerque.

== Setup ==
An expanded alquerque board is used. Four triangle boards are attached to the center of the four sides of an alquerque board. Each player has 24 pieces distinguishable from the other player.

Pieces are placed on the intersections (or "points") of the board, and specifically on their half of the alquerque board, the nearest triangular board and the triangular board on their right. Their last piece is placed on the point to the right of the central point of the alquerque board. Only the central point is left vacant in the beginning of the game.

== Rules ==
- Players alternate their turns
- A player may only use one of their pieces in a turn, and must either make a move or perform a capture but not both.
- A piece may move onto any vacant adjacent point along a line. (Note: The piece may also move in any direction provided it is available unlike in most variants of draughts where pieces are initially restricted to the forward direction)
- A piece may capture an opposing piece by the short leap as in draughts or alquerque. The piece must be adjacent to the opposing piece, and leap over it onto a vacant point immediately beyond. The leap must be in a straight line and follow the pattern on the board. (Note: Ludovici does not mention if the piece can continue to capture within the same turn as found in many draught variants and alquerque. Nor does he mention if captures are obligatory.) The captured piece is removed from the board.
- The player who captures all of the other player's pieces wins.

== Related games ==
- Peralikatuma
- Sixteen soldiers (sholo guti)
- Permainan-Tabal
- Draughts
- Alquerque
- Terhuchu, and the variant called war game
- Meurimueng-rimueng peuet ploh
- Satoel
- Astar
