= Lau kata kati =

Lau Kata Kati board with stones in initial positions

Lau kata kati is a two-player abstract strategy game from India, specifically from Lower Bengal, and also from United Provinces, Karwi Subdivision where it is called Kowwu Dunki, and it was described by H.J.R. Murray in A History of Board-Games Other Than Chess (1952). The game is related to draughts and even more so to Alquerque. Pieces are captured by leaping over them. The board is a pattern of two triangles joined together at a common vertex with further lines subdividing them. It is the same game as Butterfly (game) from Mozambique, which suggests a historical connection between the two games. Lau kata kati belongs to a specific category of games called Indian War-games, and the other games in this category are Dash-guti, Egara-guti, Pretwa, Gol-skuish. All Indian War-games have one important thing in common, and that is that all the pieces are laid out on the patterned board, with only one vacant point in the center. This forces the first move to be played on the central point, and captured by the other player's piece.

It is important to realize that Lau kata kati's patterned board is the basis of other games, in particular, Dash-guti and Egara-guti, as the boards of those two games are an expansion. It serves as a basis for other games in the same way that the standard Alquerque board and the draughts board is a basis for other games.

Lau kata kati is also known as Lau kati kata and Nau Keti Keta.

== Setup ==
The board consist of two triangles connected together at a common vertex (see diagram). Players play on opposite sides of the board with the base of each triangle forming the first rank of each player. Two lines cross the breadth of each triangle forming the second and third ranks respectively of each player. The common vertex is the fourth rank of each player, and is also the central point of the board. A single line perpendicular to the base of each triangle runs through the common vertex. There are a total of 19 intersection points. Pieces are situated on the intersection points, and move along the lines.

Each player has 9 pieces. One plays the black pieces, and the other plays the white pieces, however any two colors or distinguishable objects will do.

Players choose which color to play, and who starts first.

The 9 black pieces are initially placed on the intersection points of one of the triangles, and the 9 white pieces are placed on the intersection points of the other triangle. The only intersection point vacant is the central point of the board. Please see diagram.

Intersection points henceforth will be referred to as "points".

== Rules ==
- Players alternate their turns using one piece to either move or capture exclusively per turn.
- A piece moves one space per turn onto a vacant adjacent point along a line.
- Captures are compulsory and are done by the short leap as in draughts and Alquerque, where the adjacent enemy piece is leaped over onto a vacant point adjacently behind. The captures must be done in a straight line following the pattern on the board. A piece must continue to capture if it is able to. Captured pieces are removed immediately from the board.
- If a player captures all of their opponent's pieces, he or she is the winner.
- If a player cannot perform a move or a capture because its pieces have been blocked or immobilized by the other player's pieces, this is known as a stalemate, and the player loses; the other player wins.
- If neither player can capture any more pieces, the player with more pieces wins. If both players have the same number of pieces, then the game is a draw.

== Related games ==
- Butterfly
- Dash-guti
- Egara-guti
- Pretwa
- Gol-skuish
- Felli
- Draughts
- Alquerque
