= Tangan =

Tangan may refer to:

- Tangan River, a river in Bengal
- Tangan, a village in Xinning, Guangxi, China
- Tangan, Kurdistan, a village in Iran

== See also ==
- Tangan-tangan, a tree of the Mariana Islands
- Tanggang
- Tongan (disambiguation)
- Tangane, short for the Tanganekald people of South Australia
