= Tongan =

Tongan may refer to:

- Something of, from, or related to the country of Tonga
- Tongans, people from Tonga
- Tongan language, the national language of Tonga
- Tong'an District, a district in Xiamen, Fujian, China

== See also ==
- Tonga (disambiguation)
- Tonga language (disambiguation)
- Tonga people (Malawi)
- Tonga people (Zambia and Zimbabwe)
