= Peralikatuma =

Two-player abstract strategy board game from Sri Lanka

Peralikatuma

Peralikatuma is a two-player abstract strategy board game from Sri Lanka (formerly called Ceylon). It is a game related to draughts (checkers) and alquerque as players hop over one another's pieces when capturing them. The game was documented by Henry Parker in Ancient Ceylon: An Account of the Aborigines and of Part of the Early Civilisation (1909) with the name perali kotuwa or the war enclosure. Parker mentions that it is also played in India. It closely resembles another game from Sri Lanka called Kotu Ellima. The two games use the same board which consist of a standard alquerque board but with four triangular boards attach to its four sides. The only difference between the two games is in the number of pieces. In peralikatuma, each player has 23 pieces. In Kotu Ellima, each player has 24 pieces.

The game is also spelled as perali kotuma.

== Setup ==
The board consist of a standard alquerque board, and attached to each of its four sides is a triangle each of which are cross-sliced. This makes for a board with 49 intersections (or "points").

Each player initially has 23 pieces which are distinguishable from the other player. Each player initially places their pieces on the first two ranks of their side of the alquerque board, the nearest triangle to them, and the triangle on their left.

== Rules ==
- Players alternate their turns
- A player may only use one of their pieces in a turn, and must either make a move or perform a capture but not both.
- A piece may move onto any vacant adjacent point along a line. (Note: The piece may also move in any direction provided it is available unlike in most variants of draughts where pieces are initially restricted to the forward direction)
- A piece may capture an opposing piece by the short leap as in draughts or alquerque. The piece must be adjacent to the opposing piece, and leap over it onto a vacant point immediately beyond. The leap must be in a straight line and follow the pattern on the board. The piece may continue to capture within the same turn if it is able to do so. Captures are not obligatory. The captured piece is removed from the board.
- The player who captures all of the other player's pieces wins.

== Related games ==
- Kotu Ellima
- Sixteen soldiers (sholo guti)
- Permainan-Tabal
- Draughts
- Alquerque
- Terhuchu, and the variant called war game
- Meurimueng-rimueng peuet ploh
- Satoel
- Astar
