= Zamma =

Abstract strategy board game from Africa

9×9 zamma board and starting positions

Zamma is a two-player abstract strategy game from Africa. It is especially played in Mauritania. The game is similar to alquerque and draughts.

The game goes by several names such as damma, and in Mauritania as srand or dhamet, where it is a national game. Mauritania's version is different from the other variants in that the pieces captured are instantly removed from the board, whereas in other variants, the removal of captured pieces is deferred.

== Setup ==
Board sizes vary, but all are square grids, including 5×5 or 9×9 square grids with left and right diagonal lines running through several intersection points (or "points") of the board. The initial setup is also similar to alquerque, where every space on the board is filled with each player's pieces except for the middle point of the board. Furthermore, each player's pieces are also set up on their respective half of the board.

5×5 zamma board and starting positions

One could think of the 5×5 board as a standard alquerque board, but with additional diagonal lines, and the 9×9 board as four standard alquerque boards combined, but no additional diagonal lines.

The 5×5 square grid has left and right diagonal lines running through each point of the square grid. Depending on the rules being used, the additional points created by the intersection of the left and right diagonal lines within each square may or may not be considered a point on the board for pieces to be placed on.

The 9x9 square grid is four standard Alquerque boards arranged in a square array to form a larger square grid, with no additional diagonal lines.

Each player's pieces are distinguishable from the other player, for example, one plays with black pieces and the other with white pieces. Every point of the board is occupied by a piece except for the central point. Each player's pieces are placed on their respective half of the board; on the central row, each player places their pieces to their respective right of the central point. In Mauritania, the black pieces are referred to as men, and the white pieces as women. In the Sahara, short sticks represent the men, and camel dung represent the women.

== Rules ==
The game specifically resembles draughts in that pieces must move in the forward directions until they are crowned "Mullah" (also known as "Edhayam" or "Sultan"), which is the equivalent of the king in draughts. The Edhayam can move in any direction.

- Players alternate their turns. Black moves first.
- A piece moves forward only (straight forward or diagonally forward) one space per turn following the lines on the board until they are promoted to Mullah by reaching the first rank of their opponent (i.e., the rank furthest away from the player).
- Only one piece may be moved or used to capture enemy piece(s) per turn.
- An unpromoted piece may capture an enemy piece by the short leap as in draughts or Alquerque.
  - The capture can be in any direction.
  - Multiple captures are allowed; however, the line with the most captures must be taken.
  - Captures are compulsory for unpromoted and Mullah pieces.
- When a piece reaches the other player's rank, it is promoted to Mullah. The Mullah can move in any direction, and capture in any direction. It can also move any number of spaces as in the King in international draughts. The Mullah can also land anywhere behind the captured piece.
  If playing a variant where enemy pieces are not removed immediately when captured, the Mullah can not go back to any of them and leap them again. However, in Mauritania's variant captured pieces are removed immediately, the Mullah can leap over them again in order to leap another enemy piece(s).
- If an unpromoted piece reaches the other player's first rank as an intermediate step of a capturing sequence, the piece does not get promoted to Mullah.
- The player who captures all their opponent's pieces is the winner.

== Related Games ==
- Felli
- Kharbaga
- Khreibga

== Additional reading ==
- Bell, R. C. (1983). "Zamma". The Boardgame Book. Exeter Books. pp. 148–49. ISBN 978-0-671-06030-5.
- Mohr, Merilyn Simonds (1997). The New Games Treasury. Houghton Mifflin Company. p. 33. ISBN 978-1-57630-058-9.
- Murray, H. J. R. (1978) [First pub. 1952, Oxford University Press]. "§4.2.35 Damma, zamma". A History of Board-Games Other Than Chess (Reissued ed.). Hacker Art Books Inc. pp. 69–70. ISBN 978-0-87817-211-5.
- Parlett, David (1999). The Oxford History of Board Games. Oxford University Press Inc. p. 246. ISBN 978-0-19-212998-7.
