= Games to Play =

Book by Robert Charles Bell

Games to Play is a book written by Robert Charles Bell.

== Contents ==
Games to Play is a book which displays many games from the author's collection in 200 large full colour illustrated pages. The book is illustrated with photos of antique games, and covers traditional games such as chess and ping-pong, and games from around the world including Africa and Asia.

== Reception ==
Anthony Curtis for Financial Times said that "If you have a board games fanatic in the family they'd simply love R C Bell's Games to Play [...] which gives the rules and a lot more besides of every game you have ever heard of."

David Pritchard reviewed Games to Play for Games International magazine and stated that "A minor classic and a must-buy, I would hazard, for every dedicated games player. Compared to the average boxed game around offered at the same price, Games to Play has to be a bargain, and the idea Christmas present."

The 2012 book Eurogames: The Design, Culture and Play of Modern European Board Games lists Games to Play as one of the texts that explored the origins of commercial board games being produced in the late 19th century and early 20th century.
