= Felli =

Moroccan board game

Felli game board and starting positions

Felli is a two-player abstract strategy board game from Morocco. It is related to Alquerque and draughts as pieces leap over one another to capture. Felli's closest relatives are several thousand miles away in the form of Lau kata kati from India and the game called Butterfly from Mozambique. One main difference is that the Felli board has only one horizontal line across its breadth as opposed to two found in the other two games.

There is another version, and perhaps even the correction version, where the pieces are promoted to "Mullahs" upon reaching the other player's first rank. The "Mullahs" are like the "Kings" in International draughts, and they can move any number of unoccupied spaces. They can also leap over an enemy piece from any distance and land any distance behind it.

The game is also called Fich.

== Goal ==
The goal of each player is to capture all the other player's pieces or stalemate the other player by immobilizing its pieces.

== Equipment ==
The board is two triangles joined together at a common vertex. Each triangle has one horizontal line that dissects it across its breadth. A line also dissects both triangles across their lengths through the common vertex. There is a total of 13 intersection points of which the pieces are played upon.

There are a total of 12 pieces of which 6 pieces are black, and 6 pieces are white.

== Gameplay and rules ==
1. Players decide what colors to play, and who starts first.
2. In the beginning, each player's six pieces are set up on their respective triangle. The only vacant point is the common vertex which is also the middle point of the board.
3. A piece is moved one space (in any direction) per turn onto a vacant point following the pattern on the board.
4. A piece captures an enemy piece by the short leap as in draughts. The player's piece must be adjacent to the enemy piece, leap over it, and land onto a vacant point on the other side. The leap must be in a straight line and follow the pattern on the board. Captured pieces are removed from the board.
5. Only one piece may be used to move or capture per turn. Players alternate their turns throughout the game.
6. Mullah version: If playing the "Mullah" version, then pieces are promoted to Mullah upon reaching the other player's two corners on the first rank. The Mullahs may move any number of unoccupied spaces on the board and capture an enemy piece from any distance and land any distance behind it provided no other pieces are in between. Multiple captures are allowed. If a non-Mullah piece captures enemy pieces in a sequence of multiple captures and happens to land on the other player's first rank corners in the process, the player's piece does not become promoted to Mullah. Captures are compulsory.
