= Kharbaga =

Two-player abstract strategy game from North Africa

Kharbaga is a two-player abstract strategy game from North Africa. In a way, it is a miniature version of Zamma; however, there are more diagonal lines per square on the board as compared to Zamma. The game is considered part of the Zamma family. The game is also similar to Alquerque and draughts. The board is essentially an Alquerque board with twice the number of diagonal lines or segments allowing for greater freedom of movement. The initial setup is also similar to Alquerque, where every space on the board is filled with each player's pieces except for the middle point of the board. Moreover, each player's pieces are also set up on each player's half of the board. The game specifically resembles draughts in that pieces must move in the forward directions until they are crowned "Mullah" (or "Sultan") which is the equivalent of the King in draughts. The Mullah can move in any direction.

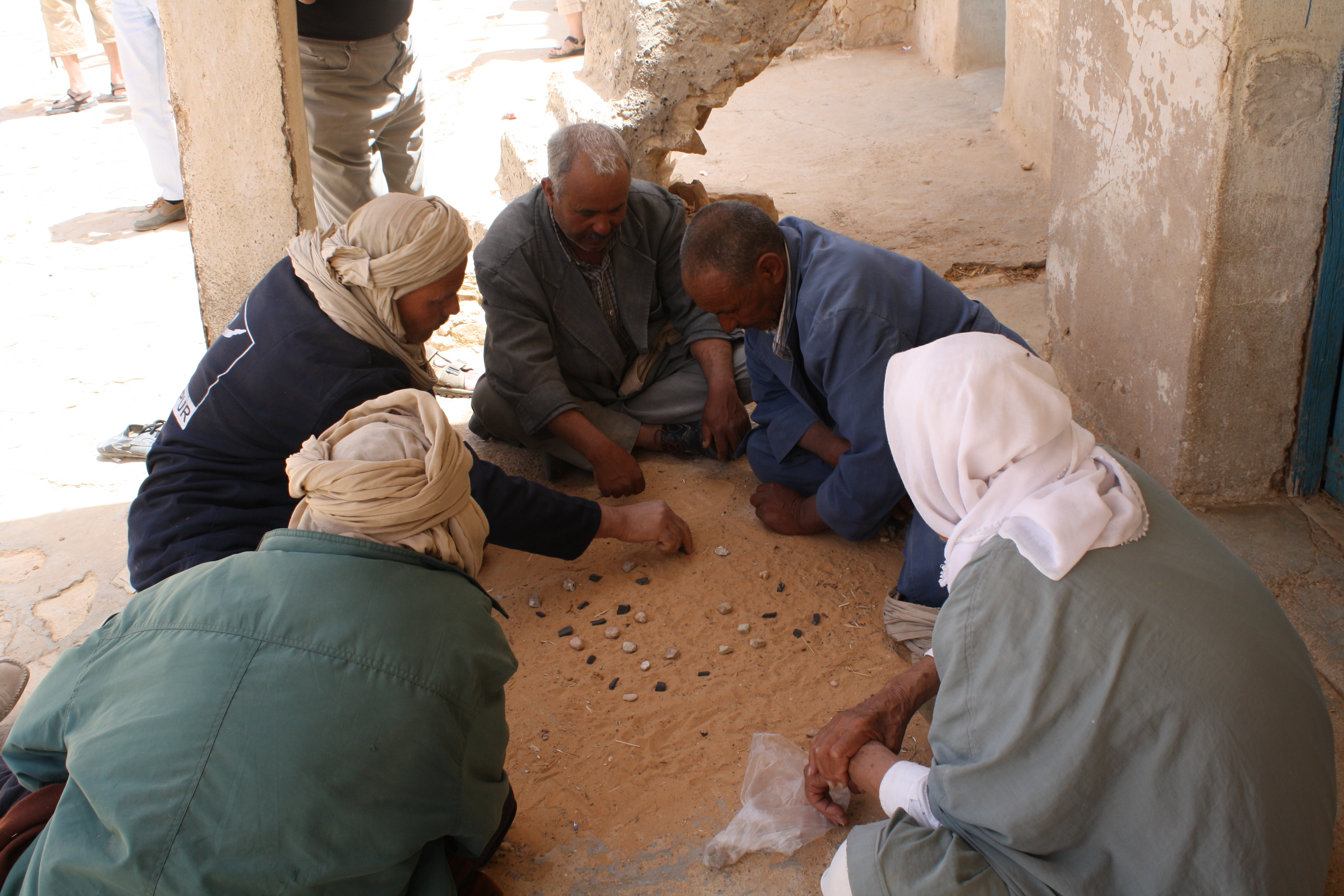
Jeu de kharbaga - Tunisie - Médenine

It is unknown how old the game is; however, the idea that pieces must move forward until they are crowned Mullah is a feature thought to have been developed and borrowed from draughts which came into being only in the 17th century. This is, however, open to debate.

Two similar games are played by the Hopi native American Indians of Arizona, US, which may suggest a historical connection with Kharbaga, and Alquerque in general. One of the Hopi games is called tukvnanawopi. The board pattern, the number of pieces, and the initial setup are the same as in Kharbaga's. The only differences, and they are significant, is that in tukvnanawopi pieces can move in any direction at any time during the game (there is no need for promotion to Mullah or King as in Kharbaga), and also when a row of squares on one end of the board becomes empty during the game, pieces can no longer be played in that row of squares. As the game progresses, more rows of squares become empty and unplayable, and the playing board continues to shrink. The other Hopi game which is also played throughout Mexico is called tuknanavuhpi. In this case, when a row of points on one end of the board becomes empty, it is no longer playable, and again the playing board shrinks as the game progresses.

Lastly, another native American Indian tribe called the Keres of New Mexico, US plays a game most similar to Kharbaga. The only difference is that pieces can move in any direction at any time during the game and each player has 22 pieces. It is uncertain how the game can be played this way since both players would yield 44 pieces total and there are only 41 intersection points that make up the board. The game is called Aiyawatstani or "chuck away grains".

== Goal ==
The player who captures all their opponent's pieces is the winner.

== Equipment ==
5×5 kharbaga board and starting positions

The board is a 5×5 square grid, or a 4×4 square board with pieces played on the intersections with left and right diagonal lines running through each square of the board. Each player has 20 pieces. One plays the black pieces, and the other player plays the white pieces.

== Gameplay and rules ==
1. Player decide which colors to play, and who starts first.
2. The board is filled in the beginning with all the players pieces. The only point vacant on the board is the middle point. Each player's pieces are placed on their half of the board, and lined up on the right-hand side of the 5th. rank (the middle horizontal line of the grid board).
3. Players alternate their turns. A non-Mullah piece moves forward only (straight forward or diagonally forward) one space per turn following the pattern on the board until they are crowned Mullah by reaching the last rank. Only one piece may be moved or used to capture enemy piece(s) per turn.
4. A non-Mullah piece may capture an enemy piece by the short leap as in draughts or Alquerqe. The capture can be in any direction. Multiple captures are allowed, however, the line with the most captures must be taken. Captures are compulsory for non-Mullah and Mullah pieces.
5. When a piece reaches the other player's rank, it is promoted to Mullah. The Mullah can move and capture in any direction. It can also move any number of spaces as in the King in international draughts. The Mullah can also capture an enemy piece from any distance, and land anywhere behind the captured piece provided there are no other pieces (friendly or not) within the spaces of the leap. If playing a variant where enemy pieces are not removed immediately when captured, the Mullah can not go back to any of them and leap them again. However, in a variant where captured pieces are removed immediately, the Mullah can leap over them again in order to leap another enemy piece(s).
6. If a non-Mullah piece reaches the other player's rank as an intermediate step of a capturing sequence, the piece does not get promoted to Mullah.

== See also ==
- Zamma
- Kharbaga
- Draughts
- Alquerque
- Felli
