= Tiger game played with forty =

Two-player board game

Game board for meurimueng-rimueng peuet ploh

Tiger game played with forty, translation of meurimueng-rimueng peuet ploh, is a two-player abstract strategy board game from Sumatra, Indonesia. The last part of the name, ploh, is sometimes spelled "plo". It is specifically played by the Acehnese. The game was described in The Achehnese by Hurgronje, O'Sullivan, and Wilkinson in 1906. The game is basically an enlarged version of alquerque, played on four adjoining alquerque boards arranged as a square array, resulting in 81 intersection points. The same board is used in zamma. The rules are exactly those of alquerque, except that captures are not compulsory.

It is also played in Java, Indonesia where it is called dam-daman. However, dam-daman is also a general term for draughts (checkers) in Indonesia. The game is also played in India especially in Punjab where it is called ratti-chitti-bakri.

== Setup ==
In this game the board is composed of four alquerque boards joined together to form a large square board consisting of 81 intersection points. There are a total of 80 game pieces, 40 black and 40 white.

Each player places their pieces on the intersection points on their half of the board, and on the middle row they place their pieces to the right (from their perspective) of the central intersection point in the game. The central intersection point is the only intersection point (or "point" here-in-forth) left vacant at the beginning of the game. In this game, the vacant central point is called the pusat (navel) in Acehnese.

Players decide what color to play, and who starts first.

=== Satoel ===
Game board for satoel

Satoel is a similar game played in Simeulue island (or Simalur island) off the west coast of Sumatra. It uses the same board except two additional triangular board sections are added on opposite sides of the board. The board sections are cross sliced, adding six intersection points each, thus bringing the total number of intersections points to 93. Each player starts the game with 46 pieces. Setup and play is almost the same as that of meurimueng-rimueng peuet ploh, except for a few differences as noted. It is briefly described by H.J.R. Murray in A History of Board-Games Other Than Chess (1952).

In satoel, players sit on opposite sides of the board from one another each with a triangular board section near them, therefore when each player fills their half of the board with their own pieces, they each fill their own triangular board section. For the middle row they place their pieces to the left (from their perspective) of the central intersection point in the game, which is a relatively trivial difference.

== Rules ==
- Players take turns making a move or a capture.
- A player may move a piece (in any direction) along a marked line onto a vacant adjacent point on the board, and this ends the player's turn.
- A player may capture an adjacent enemy piece by the short leap as in draughts and alquerque. The player's piece must be adjacent to the enemy piece, leap over it along a marked straight line, and land onto the vacant point immediately beyond. When possible, the player's piece may continue capturing within the same turn, but a player can decide when to stop capturing and thus end the turn.
- Captured pieces are removed from the board.
- Capturing is not compulsory.
- The player who captures all of their opponent's pieces is the winner.

== Related games ==
- Kharbaga
- Meurimueng-rimueng-do
