= Tonga language =

Tonga may refer to five different languages:

- Tongan language, or Tonga (ISO 639-3: ton), a Polynesian language spoken in Tonga in the South Pacific
- Tonga language (Zambia and Zimbabwe), or Chitonga (ISO 639-3: toi), a Bantu language spoken in Zambia and Zimbabwe
- Tonga language (Malawi), (ISO 639-3: tog), a dialect of Chitumbuka (Tumbuka) language spoken in Nkhata Bay District in Malawi
- Tonga language (Mozambique), or Gitonga (ISO 639-3: toh), a Bantu language spoken in Mozambique
- Ten'edn, also known as Tonga or Mos (ISO 639-3: tnz), a Mon-Khmer language spoken in Thailand and Malaysia
