= Sixteen soldiers =

Board game

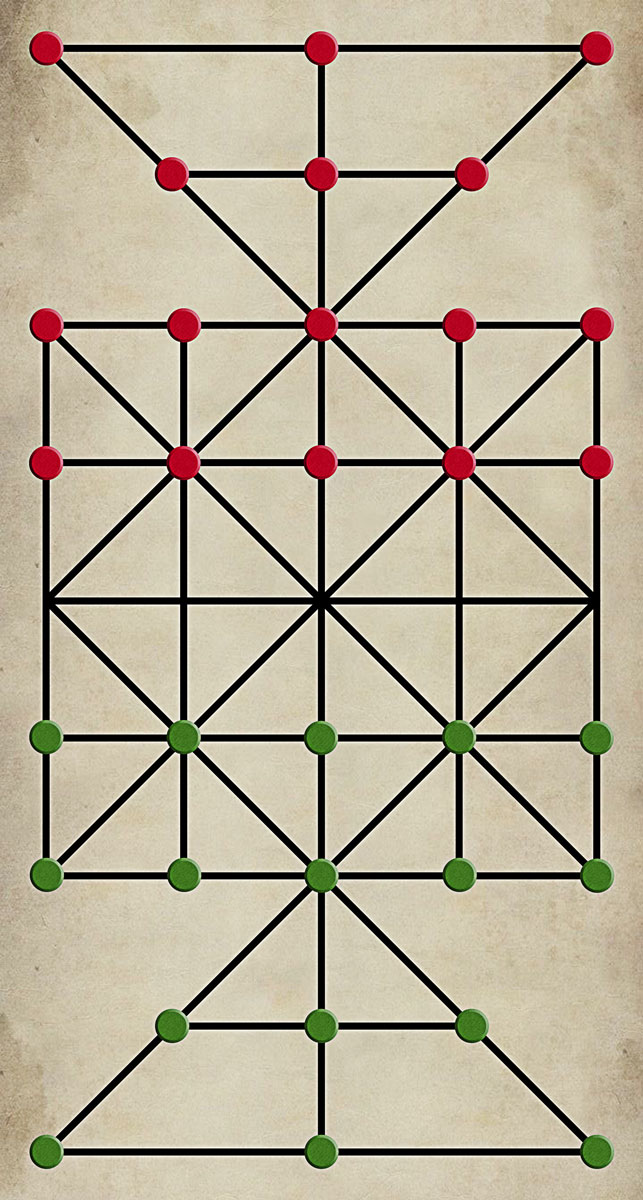
Board and starting positions for sholo guti, or sixteen soldiers

Sixteen soldiers is a two-player abstract strategy board game from Sri Lanka. It also comes from India under the name cows and leopards. A variant of this game is also popular in Bangladesh, where it is known as sholo guti (sixteen pieces). One way it is played (especially in villages), is by drawing the court of the game on the ground and using stones as pawns.

The game was documented by Henry Parker in Ancient Ceylon: An Account of the Aborigines and of Part of the Early Civilisation (1909) with the name Hēwākam Keliya or the War Game. Parker mentions that the game is also played in India and Bangladesh under the name sōlah guttiya or sixteen balls. The game is similar to draughts (checkers) and alquerque as players hop over one another's pieces to capture them; it is more similar to alquerque between the two since it uses a standard alquerque board. However, unlike standard alquerque, an additional two triangular boards are attached on two opposite sides of the standard alquerque board. Furthermore, pieces can move and capture in any direction from the beginning.

Parker mentions that the game pieces are called "soldiers", and when a soldier is captured it is said to be "chopped".

Its actual closest relatives are peralikatuma and Kotu Ellima which are also from Sri Lanka. The difference between these three closely related games is that Peralikatuma and Kotu Ellima have four triangular board extensions as opposed to two. Also the number of pieces differ. In sixteen soldiers, each player has 16 pieces hence the name of the game. In peralikatuma, each player has 23 pieces. In Kotu Ellima, each player has 24 pieces. Sixteen soldiers is also related to the Indonesian game of Permainan-Tabal.

== Setup ==
An expanded alquerque board is used. Two triangle boards are attached to two opposite sides of an alquerque board. Each player has 16 pieces that are distinguishable from the other player. Pieces are placed on the intersections (or "points") of the board, specifically on their half of the alquerque board, and the nearest triangular board.

== Rules ==
The following rules are based upon Parker's description:

- Players alternate their turns
- A player may only use one of their pieces in a turn, and must either make a move or perform a capture but not both.
- A piece may move onto any vacant adjacent point along a line. (Note: The piece may also move in any direction provided it is available unlike in most variants of draughts where pieces are initially restricted to the forward direction)
- A piece may capture an opposing piece by the short leap as in draughts or alquerque. The piece must be adjacent to the opposing piece, and leap over it onto a vacant point immediately beyond. The leap must be in a straight line and follow the pattern on the board. Captures are not mandatory. A piece can continue to capture within the same turn, and may stop capturing any time. The captured piece (or pieces) is removed from the board.
- The player who captures all of the other player's pieces wins.

== Related games ==
- Peralikatuma
- Kotu Ellima
- Permainan-Tabal
- Draughts
- Alquerque
