= Robert Charles Bell =

British author of books on board games (1917–2002)

- Born: 1914; Sudbury, Ontario
- Died: 2002 (aged 87–88)

Robert Charles Bell (1917–2002) was the author of several books on board games, most importantly Board and Table Games 1 & 2 (reprinted as Board and Table Games from Many Civilizations). This work won the Premier Award of the Doctors' Hobbies Exhibition, London. He was instrumental in popularizing traditional games, and is acknowledged as one of 11 "principal sources" in David Parlett's The Oxford History of Board Games.

== Life ==
He was born 1917 in Sudbury, Ontario and moved to England in 1928; and was educated at Haileybury College, Hertfordshire and St Bartholomew's Hospital by 1941. He became a consultant plastic surgeon and was on the editorial board of the British Journal of Plastic Surgery. Outside medicine, Bell was a polymath who became an international authority on board games and wrote books for collectors on Tyneside Pottery and Trade Tokens. His first work on games was Board and Table Games (1960), and he later produced many articles on coin collecting for World Coins.

He died in 2002. As of 2007, much of his extensive collection of games and game paraphernalia resides at the University of Durham.

== Categories of board and table games ==
Bell gives origins, history and some game-playing details for some 180 games in the 2 volumes of his main work (Board and Table Games). He divides board games into four main categories:

- A race game requires the pieces to move from a start point to a finish point usually based on the throw of dice (e.g. Ludo).
- A wargame involves movement (and occasionally placement) and is typically won with the capture of all opponent pieces (e.g. draughts) or a special opponent piece (e.g. chess).
- A positional game requires the winning player to form a pattern or shape by merely placing (noughts and crosses and Go are respectively the simplest and most complex examples) or placing and moving pieces on a board (nine men's morris).
- Mancala games involve players distributing seeds across a series of holes and collecting the contents of holes that achieve specific numeric or numeric/positional status. Typically one wins by collecting the most seeds, or rendering the opponent unable to move.

Bell used the basic categories suggested by Murray with some alterations. Because his treatment extended beyond board games, Bell also included the categories of dice and domino games; and in his second volume added "Games of Words and Numbers", "Card Games Requiring Boards", and "Games of manual dexterity". In addition, there is mention of the subgenre of solitaire and puzzle games.

Bell drew on a wide range of sources, including Edward Falkener, Stewart Culin, Willard Fiske, H. J. R. Murray, John Scarne, as well as his own research and collection.

== Publications ==
=== Books about board and table games ===
Robert Charles Bell MB, FRCS (R. C. Bell)

- Board And Table Games From Many Civilizations 1 – Oxford University Press, 1960.
- Board And Table Games From Many Civilizations 2 – Oxford University Press, 1969.

- Board And Table Games From Many Civilizations (revised edition with above two volumes bound into a single book) - Dover Publications, Mineola, New York, 1979. ISBN 0-486-23855-5; reprinted by Exeter Books, New York City, 1983.

- Tangram Teasers: A Selection Of Ch'i Ch'iau Puzzles – Corbitt & Hunter, Newcastle upon Tyne, 1965. ISBN 978-0900309069.
- Discovering Old Board Games – Shire Publications #182, 1973. ISBN 0-85263-235-5
- Discovering Backgammon – Shire Publications #201, 1975. ISBN 0-85263-263-0
- Discovering Mah-Jong – Shire Publications #222, 1976. ISBN 0 85263 444 7
- Discovering Chess – Shire Publications #221, 1976. ISBN 0 85263 478 1. A second edition, revised by Ken Whyld, was published in 1979.
- The Boardgame Book – Bookthrift Company / Marshall Cavendish / Knapp Press / Viking Press / Penguin Books, London, 1979. ISBN 0 89535 007 6.

- Les Plus beaux jeux du monde (French edition of the above) – Fernand Nathan, 1979. ISBN 978-2092846216.
- Das große Buch der Brettspiele (German edition of the above) – ?, 1979?.

- Discovering Dice And Dominoes - Shire Publications #255, 1980. ISBN 0 85263 532 X.
- Oriental Games - Gulbenkian Museum of Oriental Art / University of Durham, 1981.
- Board And Table Game Antiques - Shire Publications (Shire Album 60), 1981. ISBN 0 85263 538 9.
- Games to Play: Board And Table Games For All The Family - Michael Joseph / Penguin Group / Guild Publishing, 1988. ISBN 0 7181 2993 8.
- A Compendium Of Games: Family Entertainment From Around The World – Smithmark Publications, 1999. ISBN 978-0765117083.

Robbie Bell and Michael Cornelius

- Board Games Round The World: A Resource Book For Mathematical Investigations – Cambridge University Press, 1988. ISBN 0 521 35924 4.

=== Other books ===
R. C. Bell

- Commercial Coins 1787–1804 – Corbitt & Hunter, Newcastle upon Tyne, 1963.
- Copper Commercial Coins 1811–1819 – Corbitt & Hunter, Newcastle upon Tyne, 1964.
- Tradesmen's Tickets And Private Tokens 1785-1819 – Corbitt & Hunter, Newcastle upon Tyne, 1966.
- Specious Tokens And Those Struck For General Circulation 1784-1804 – Corbitt & Hunter, Newcastle upon Tyne, 1968.
- Tyneside Pottery - Littlehampton Book Services Ltd, 1971. ISBN 978-0289700532.
- Monographs On Plastic Surgery, volume 1: The Use Of Skin Grafts – Oxford University Press, 1973.
- Unofficial Farthings 1820-1870 – B.A. Seaby, London, 1975. ISBN 978-0900652400.
- The Building Medalets Of Kempson And Skidmore 1796-1797 – Frank Graham, Newcastle upon Tyne, 1978. ISBN 978-0859831055.
- Maling And Other Tyneside Pottery – Shire Publications, 1986. ISBN 978-0852637920.
- Political And Commemorative Pieces Simulating Tradesmen's Tokens 1770-1802 - ?, Felixstowe, 1987.
- Bell's Unofficial Farthings: A Supplement – Whitmore, 1994. ISBN 978-0951325735.

R. C. Bell and M. A. V. Gill

- Potteries Of Tyneside – Frank Graham, 1973. ISBN 978-0902833777.

R. C. Bell and Simon Rodway

- Fun at the Lathe - Guild of Master Craftsman Publications Ltd, 1998.

Edited by R. C. Bell

- Diaries From The Days Of Sail (with an Introduction by Alan Villiers) – Holt Rinehart & Winston, 1974. ISBN 978-0030129414.

=== Miscellaneous ===
- Token Tales – a series of articles, originally appearing in 'World Coins' in the 1960s and 1970s, republished by the Conder Token Collector's Club from 2003
- Games of the World – this book, edited by Frederic V. Grunfeld and published by Ballantine Books of New York in 1975, cited R.C. Bell and Léon Vié as Editorial Consultants.
