= List of traditional games in Africa =

There is a wide variety of traditional games in Africa. They include variations of foot-racing, jumping, stick-fighting, dancing, moonlight and ritual plays, swimming, horse racing, and wrestling, as well as board games and gambling games.

== Background and types ==
In the precolonial period, participants in physical sports could gain status, identity, and power. Some types include foot-racing, jumping, stick-fighting, dancing, moonlight and ritual plays, swimming, horse-racing, and wrestling. In the latter, participants would often represent their village or region, training from a young age for the big community events. Physical skill has traditionally been associated with hunting, pastoral work, food gathering, and warriors. In some parts of the continent sport was taken very seriously, in others less so, for instance in Setswana the closest match means "play that is not serious". Canoe racing was common along the Ubangi River in Central Africa, and warriors engaged in archery, spear throwing, and cattle racing. Sport was traditionally masculine, and largely excluded women, except in dance, and in some cases wrestling. However many traditional games have been poorly documented and lost.

Gambling was widespread and often played at high stakes, where games were interpreted within the relevant cosmologies. Regions where it was especially popular were the Guinea coast and Central Africa, however it was usually stigmatised.

Colonial governments viewed the expansion of European sports as key to their "civilising mission", and many traditional games died out. Colonial education systems formalised the teaching of Western sports, thought to instil "moral character", while traditional sports were viewed as "primitive, immoral, and anti-Christian". In some cases, mission schools promoted traditional games that had close European counterparts. The Tutsi high-jumping contest gusimbuka was revered by colonists. Gambling games such as abbia in Cameroon were suppressed.

In the postcolonial period, Western sports have been heavily prioritised over traditional sports. Physical education in the present-day remains largely based on the colonial/Western model, and traditional sports aren't usually included in the curriculum. There are also no traditional sports in the African Games. The African Traditional Sports and Games Confederation (ATSGC), a branch of the International Council of Traditional Sports and Games (ICTSG), seeks to protect Africa's traditional games, and the first African Traditional Sports and Games is scheduled to be held in Swakopmund, Namibia for June 2026.

== Physical games ==
=== North Africa ===
| Name | Type | Group (country) | Sources |
|---|---|---|---|
| Hyena chase | Foot-racing | North Africa | |
| Tahtib | Stick-fighting | Egypt | |

=== West Africa ===
| Name | Type | Group (country) | Sources |
|---|---|---|---|
| Ampe | Rhythmic game (girls only) | Nigeria and Ghana | |
| Gidigbo | Wrestling | Yoruba people (Nigeria) | |
| Agbārin (a.k.a. Ārin) | | Yoruba people (Nigeria) | |
| Dambe | Wrestling | Hausa people (Nigeria) | |
| Ata so | Children's game | Nigeria | |
| Lucha canaria | Wrestling | Guanches and Canarians (Canary Islands, Spain) | |
| Asafo atwele | Martial art | Ga people (Ghana) | |
| Pilolo | Children's game | Ghana | |
| Senegalese wrestling | Wrestling | Senegal | |
| Abaogo | Racket game | Côte d'Ivoire | |
| Egede | Racket game | Niger | |
| African ball toss (a.k.a. "coconut golf") | Ball game | West Africa (especially Côte d'Ivoire and Guinea) | |

=== Central Africa ===
| Name | Type | Group (country) | Sources |
|---|---|---|---|
| Capoeira Angola | | Angola | |
| Kandeka | Martial art | Angola | |
| N'golo | Martial art | Angola | |
| Bulundu | Ball game | Luba people (DR Congo) | |
| Camel racing | | Chad among others | |
| Kuli | Ball game | Tio people (Republic of Congo) | |

=== East Africa ===
| Name | Type | Group (country) | Sources |
|---|---|---|---|
| Gusimbuka | High jumping | Tutsi (Rwanda and Burundi) | |
| Camel racing | | Kenya among others | |
| Moraingy | Martial art | Madagascar | |
| Nuba wrestling | Wrestling | Nuba people (Sudan) | |
| Chandimu | Ball game (similar to association football) | Tanzania | |
| Fire on the Mountain | Children's game | Tanzania | |
| Donga | Stick fighting | Surma people (Ethiopia) | |
| Kigumi | Stick fighting | Meru people (Kenya) | |
| Istunka | Ceremonial martial art | Somalia | |
| Savika | Zebu-wrestling | Betsileo people (Madagscar) | |

=== Southern Africa ===
| Name | Type | Group (country) | Sources |
|---|---|---|---|
| Nguni stick-fighting | Stick fighting | Nguni peoples (South Africa) | |
| Tshikanganga and Tshigombela | Team dances | Venda people (South Africa) | |
| Musangwe | Fist-fighting | Venda people (South Africa) | |
| Jukskei | | Afrikaners (South Africa) | |

== Non-physical games ==
Mancala has been played across the continent, and has many different names and versions, such that it has been called "the national game of Africa".

=== North Africa ===
| Name | Type | Group (country) | Sources |
|---|---|---|---|
| Hounds and jackals | | Ancient Egypt | |
| Felli | | Morocco | |
| Fetaix | | Morocco | |
| Kharbaga | Abstract strategy game | North Africa | |
| Mehen | Board game | Ancient Egypt | |
| Senet | Board game | Ancient Egypt | |
| Tâb | Running-fight game | North Africa | |

=== West Africa ===
| Name | Type | Group (country) | Sources |
|---|---|---|---|
| Achi | Abstract strategy game | Ghana | |
| Choko | | Mandinka and Fula peoples (The Gambia) | |
| Dara | | Various peoples and countries in West Africa | |
| Wali | Board game | West Africa | |
| Yoté | Board game | West Africa | |
| Zamma | Abstract strategy game | Mauritania | |

=== Central Africa ===
| Name | Type | Group (country) | Sources |
|---|---|---|---|
| Abbia | Gambling game | Beti people (Cameroon) | |

=== East Africa ===
| Name | Type | Group (country) | Sources |
|---|---|---|---|
| Fanorona | | Madagascar | |
| Carambolla | Gambling game | Ethiopia | |
| Makonn | Abstract strategy game | Seychelles | |
| Shisima | Abstract strategy game | Kenya | |
| Turup | Card game | Somalia | |

=== Southern Africa ===
| Name | Type | Group (country) | Sources |
|---|---|---|---|
| Morabaraba | Strategy board game | South Africa and Botswana | |
| Fahfee | Gambling game | South Africa | |
| Tsoro yematatu | Abstract strategy game | Zimbabwe | |

== See also ==
- Sport in Africa
- Traditional games of Nigeria
- Traditional games of South Africa
