= Tsoro yematatu =

Board game from Zimbabwe

Tsoro yematatu is a two-player abstract strategy game from Zimbabwe. Players first drop their three pieces onto the board, and then move them to create a 3 in-a-row which wins the game. It is similar to games including Tapatan, Achi, Nine holes, Shisima, and Tant Fant. Uniquely pieces can jump over each other (without capture) which adds an extra dimension in the manoeuvrability of the pieces.

There is some uncertainty about the correct name as Tsoro yemamutatu is also used; 'ma' or 'mai' being the chikaranga for 'mother'...hence 'mamutatu' means 'mother mutatu'.

== Goal ==
To be first to create a three-in-a-row with one's pieces

== Equipment ==
The board is an isosceles triangle with one line across its breadth, and another line running down the length of the board down its central axis. This creates seven intersection points where the pieces can be played. Other variations of the board are also used, such as a square board divided by 4 lines, creating an asterisk-style pattern with 8 triangle spaces for pieces to be placed on.

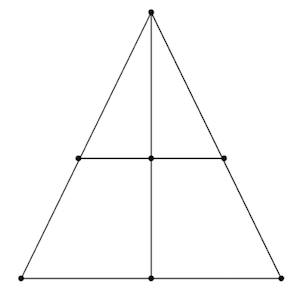
Tsoro

Each player has three pieces. One plays the black pieces, and the other player plays the white pieces.

== Game play and rules ==
1. The board is empty in the beginning. Players decide what colour pieces to play, and who starts first.
2. Each player drops one piece per turn on any vacant point on the board. Players alternate their turns. Pieces cannot be moved until all six pieces have been dropped. (After all pieces have been dropped, there is only one vacant point on the board.)
3. A piece can be moved one of two ways: a) A piece can move one space per turn onto a vacant point following the pattern on the board, or b) a piece can jump over another piece (friend or foe) adjacent to it, and land on a vacant point on the other side; the jump must be in a straight line and follow the pattern on the board. There are no captures in this game.
4. The game can last a very long time, and if no one is still able to create the 3 in-a-row, the players can agree to a draw.

== Related games ==
Tapatan, achi, nine holes, tant fant, shisima, tic-tac-toe, tsoro, tsoro yemutwelve
