= Incredible Zigi =

Ghanaian choreographer (born 1994)

Michael Amofa
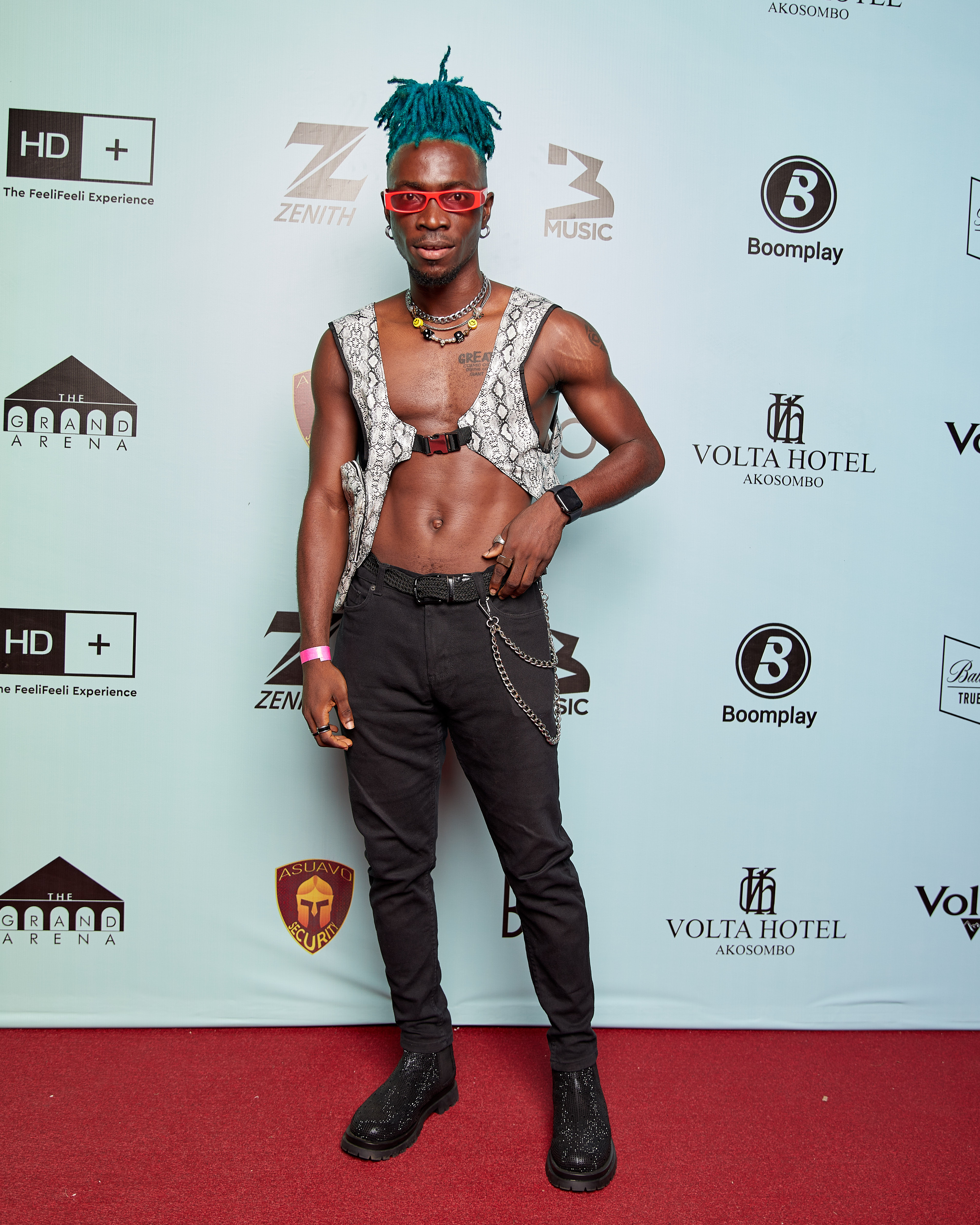
- Born: Amofa Michael; October 17, 1994 (age 31); Accra, Ghana
- Occupations: Dance artist, choreographer
- Years active: 2003–present
- Height: 5 ft 8 in (173 cm)
- Career
- Current group: AfroZig
- Former groups: swap geez, 2tyt crew, Pipeline dance Crew, one spirit crew, Gbeke theory dance cliq, gentlemen dance crew
- Dances: Hip-hop dance, Afro Dance
- Website: theincrediblezigi.com

Amofa Michael (born 17 October 1994) known professionally as Incredible Zigi, is a Ghanaian dance artist and choreographer.

== Dance career ==
Michael began dancing professionally in 2003, on the streets of Accra.

His career began with the help of his brother, who gave him the opportunity to travel and participate in dance workshops.

He is credited to have created the PILOLO and KUPE dance steps as elements in Afrobeats/Azonto. Musicians such as Janet Jackson have infused these dance steps in their choreography and have performed them on tour and in their videos. The KUPE dance was featured on the NBA 2K20 by the game developers Visual Concepts. Michael is noted for his dance challenges on social media.

== Original dances ==
Kupe - Kupe Dance is a song by Ghanaian-UK-based artist A-Star. But Michael is credited to have created the KUPE dance steps.

Pilolo - Pilolo dance was created by Michael and became a hit in New York City with Janet Jackson performing Pilolo at the end of her performance “Made for Now” on “The Tonight Show” starring Jimmy Fallon. The name Pilolo was borrowed from a hide and seek game popular among Ghanaian kids.

Ena - Ena', is a popularly used Akan language conjunction which translates to English as “And”. Michael Started the Ena Dance in 2019 and it is known for going viral on social media within weeks.
