= Birrguu Matya =

Birrguu Matya is claimed to be a traditional Australian Aboriginal game taught to children from a young age to develop skill, patience and lateral thinking for the purposes of sharpening their hunting skills in later life, however it appears to be similar or identical to a game played in Asia called Tapatan. Birrguu Matya is marketed as belonging to the cultural history of the Wiradjuri People who are considered the first inhabitants of the Bathurst district and have been living there for at least 40,000 years.

The name Birrguu Matya seems to be attributable to words from two discontiguous languages, Wiradjuri, spoken in southern New South Wales and Paakanytji, spoken in north-west New South Wales. It appears that the words birrguu (Wiradjuri, meaning bush) and matya (Paakanytji, meaning game or bold) were taken from Macquarie Aboriginal Words, published in 1994, only a few years prior to the game being released as a commercial product.

The game can be said to be a simplified Chess and a slightly more strategic Tic-tac-toe or naughts and crosses.

== Object & Rules of Birrguu Matya ==
The object of the game is to get your three stones in a row before your opponent. You can win diagonally, vertically or horizontally. Starting with an empty cloth, each player takes turns placing down one of their stones. Both players are simultaneously complete their line of three while blocking their opponent.

Phase two of the game begins when all the pieces are laid done and no one has positioned three in a row. At this stage, players take turns moving their stones one square at a time in any direction, provided the square is vacant. You cannot skip a move and you cannot lift a stone and jump.

While the game is similar in strategy to other ancient games, its marketers claim it to be a rarely occurring "table game", not generally found in Australian indigenous culture. This claim is questionable given that no Australian antecedents of the game have been documented.
