= Nine holes =

Abstract strategy game

Nine holes is played on a game board with nine holes

Nine holes is a two-player abstract strategy game from different parts of the world and is centuries old. It was very popular in England. It is related to tic-tac-toe, but even more related to three men's morris, achi, tant fant, shisima, picaria, and dara, because pieces are moved on the board to create the 3 in a row. It is an alignment game.

== Rules and Gameplay ==
The game is played with a game board with 9 spaces or holes, arranged in a 3 by 3 grid with horizontal and vertical lines. Each player has 3 pieces. The board starts out empty. The game is then played through two stages:

=== Drop phase ===
Each player drops one piece per turn on any vacant space on the board. Players alternate their turns. Pieces cannot move until all three pieces have been dropped.

=== Move phase ===
After each player's three pieces have been dropped on the board, each player can move a piece to an adjacent vacant space on the board. Only one piece can be moved per turn. A variation of the game rules exists where pieces can be moved to any vacant space.

The winner is the first player to create a 3 in a row, either horizontally or vertically (not diagonally), using their pieces. Players can create the 3 in a row at either the drop phase or move phase, and win the game.
