= Picaria =

Two-player abstract strategy game from the Zuni Native American Indians or Pueblo Indians

Picaria gameboard

Picaria is a two-player abstract strategy game from the Zuni Native American Indians or the Pueblo Indians of the American Southwest. It is related to tic-tac-toe, but more related to three men's morris, Nine Holes, Achi, Tant Fant, and Shisima, because pieces can be moved to create the three-in-a-row. Picaria is an alignment game.

There are two variations to Picaria. The first version is simpler with 9 spaces or intersection points, and the second version uses 13 spaces or intersection points. The rules are the same.

== Goal ==
To create a three-in-a-row of one's pieces either horizontally, vertically, or diagonally.

== Equipment ==
A 3×3 board is used for the first version. Three horizontal lines form the three rows. Three vertical lines form the three columns. Two diagonal lines connect the two opposite corners of the board. Additionally, there are four more diagonal lines connecting the midpoints. These four additional diagonal lines is what makes the Picaria board different from Tapatan or Achi. The intersection points are where the pieces are played.

The second version uses a similar board except there are four additional spaces or intersection points to play pieces at. The four additional spaces or intersection points are at the intersection of the four additional diagonal lines with those of the larger diagonal lines.

Each player has three pieces. One plays the black pieces, and the other plays the white pieces, however, any two colors or distinguishable objects will suffice.

== Rules and gameplay ==
1. The board is empty in the beginning.
2. Players decide what colors to play, and who will start first.
3. Drop phase: Players alternate turns dropping one of their pieces onto the vacant spaces on the board. The center space (central intersection point) cannot be used until after each player drops their first piece (a variant is the center space cannot be used after all pieces are dropped). Pieces cannot move until all three pieces from each player have been dropped.
4. Move phase: Each piece can now move any direction one space at a time following the pattern on the board. Pieces cannot be jumped or captured. Only one piece can be moved per turn.
5. Players can create the three-in-a-row at either the drop phase or move phase and win the game.

=== House rules ===
These are rules that you and the other player can agree upon. They are not standard for the game.

- A stalemate where one player cannot make a move is cause for a draw of the game, or a loss to that player.
- Repeating a position three times can be cause for a draw.

== See also ==
- Nine Holes
- Three men's morris
- Achi
- Tant Fant
- Shisima
- Dara (game)
- Tic-tac-toe
