= Fire on the Mountain =

Fire on the Mountain may refer to:

== Music ==
- "Fire on the Mountain", a traditional old time fiddle tune dating to at least the early 19th century
- Fire on the Mountain (album), a 1974 album by Charlie Daniels
- "Fire on the Mountain" (The Marshall Tucker Band song), a song on the 1975 album Searchin' for a Rainbow
- "Fire on the Mountain" (Grateful Dead song), a 1978 song by the Grateful Dead
- "Fire on the Mountain", a song by Hanson on the 2007 album The Walk
- "Fire on the Mountain", an instrumental by The 2010 Vancouver Olympic Orchestra played at the 2010 Winter Olympics opening ceremony

== Literature and film ==
- Fire on the Mountain (Abbey novel), a 1962 novel by Edward Abbey
  - Fire on the Mountain (1981 film), a 1981 television movie adaptation of the Edward Abbey novel
- Fire on the Mountain, a 1977 novel by Anita Desai
- Fire on the Mountain (Bisson novel), a 1988 novel by Terry Bisson
- Fire on the Mountain, a 1994 illustrated alternate history fiction book by Jane Kurtz
- Fire on the Mountain (1996 film), a 1996 documentary about the 10th Mountain Division of World War II
- Fire on the Mountain (Maclean book), a 1999 non-fiction book by John Norman Maclean
- Fire on the Mountain, an episode of the 2013 BBC Radio production of William Golding's Lord of the Flies
- Fire on the Mountain, a 2020 short film by the Grateful Dead and Chris Bentchetler

== Other ==
- Euphorbia cyathophora, a member of the Euphorbia genus of plants
- Fire on the Mountain (game), a game played by children in Tanzania and in some parts of South Africa
