= Indigenous Games Festival (South Africa) =

Event for traditional South African games

- First season: 2003
- Motto: My roots, my pride, my future

The National Indigenous Games Festival is an annual event in South Africa to celebrate the nation's traditional games. The first event took place in 2003. The provinces of South Africa compete in the event as teams, with KwaZulu-Natal having won the event 10 times in a row as of the 2021 edition.

== Games ==
- Kho-kho
- Jukskei
- Morabaraba
- Dibeke
- Drie stokkies
