= Traditional games of South Africa =

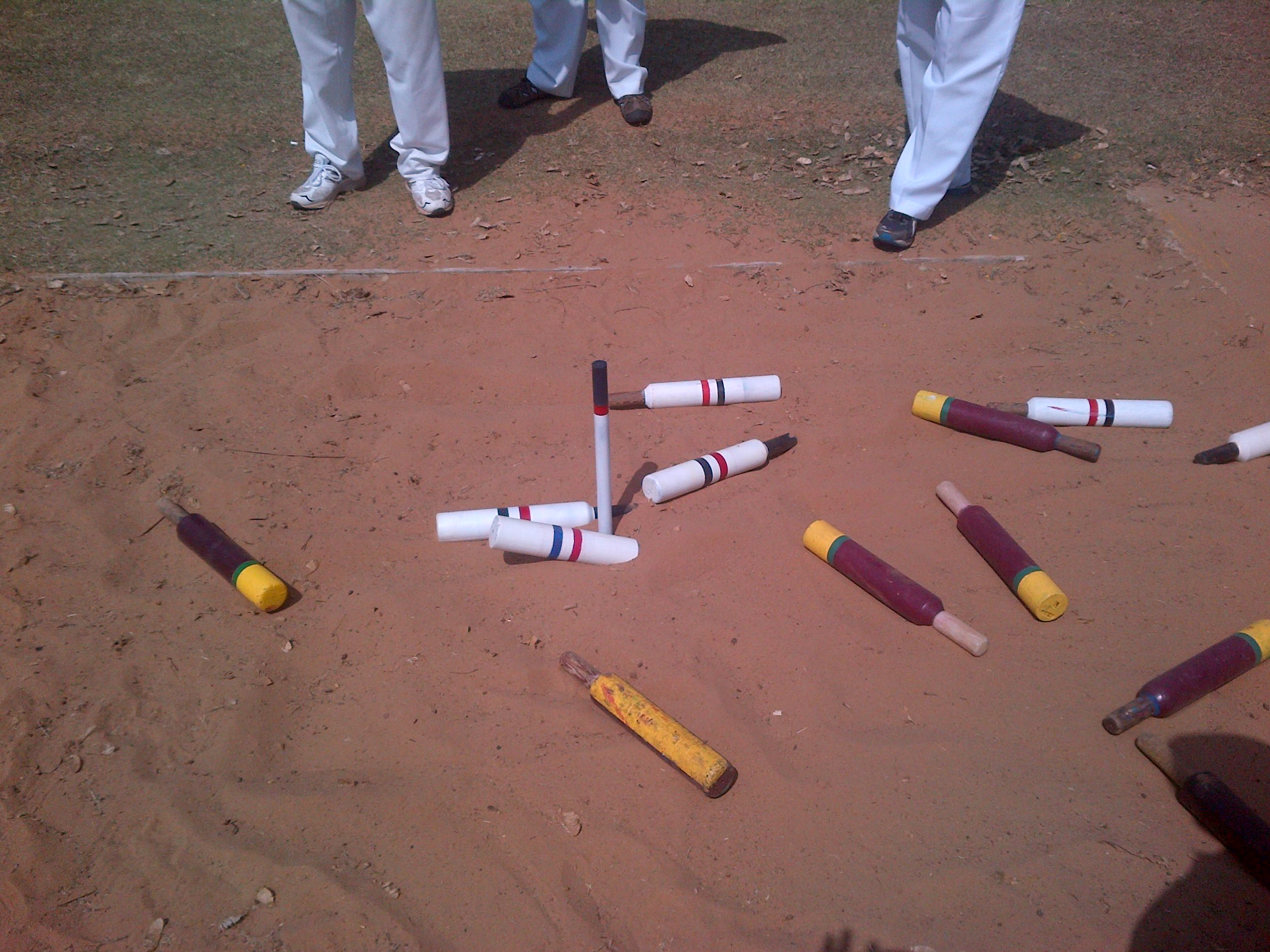
A jukskei game in progress.

South Africa has some traditional games.

== History ==
Some traditional South African games are played annually at the National Indigenous Games Festival in September.

== Traditional games ==
=== Bok-bok ===
In this game, players stand upright against a wall while opponents try to jump on their back to make them collapse.

by the opponents.[4]

=== Drie stokkies ===
Drie stokkies resembles the triple jump event: it involves participants trying to jump between three sticks, with the winner being decided by the last person that only managed to step once between each stick.

=== Jukskei ===
Dimensions of a Jukskei field - distances given to closest pin; 9m between pins

The object of the game is to knock over a peg that is planted in a sandpit over a distance of between 10 and 16 meters (depending on age and gender). It is played in teams with usually four members each. Each member has two skeis (and thus two turns). The playing field consists of two pits juxtaposed in opposite directions, so that play can take place in both directions. Each time a team member knocks over the peg, he gets three points. If the peg wasn't knocked out, the team lying closest to the position of the peg scores as many points as they have skeis closer to the peg than their opponent's closest skei. The first team to get exactly 23 points first wins the game. If the team gets more than 23 points, they start from 0.

=== Kho-kho ===
Kho kho is a traditional Indian sport that dates to ancient India. It is one of the most popular traditional tag games in the Indian subcontinent after kabaddi. Kho kho is played on a rectangular court with a central lane connecting two poles at either end of the court. During the game, nine players from the chasing team (attacking team) are on the field, with eight of them sitting (crouched) in the central lane, while three runners from the defending team run around the court and try to avoid being touched or caught. Each sitting player on the chasing team faces the opposite half of the field.

It is believed that kho-kho arrived in South Africa with the importation of indentured Indian servants by the British.

== Dodgeball variants ==
=== Dibeke ===
Dibeke is a game similar to football and dodgeball; in this game, the attacking team attempts to kick a ball down the length of the field in order to score points, while the defending team is allowed to pick up the ball with their hands and throw it at members of the attacking team to eliminate them.

=== Dithini ===
In dithini, players attempt to stack up various tin cans into a predetermined shape, while opponents can eliminate stacking players by hitting them with a ball.

=== Goat in the cage ===
Two players stand on either side of the playing area, and attempt to eliminate players by throwing the ball at them. The last remaining player wins.

== Board games ==
=== Morabaraba ===
Morabaraba is a traditional two-player strategy board game played in South Africa and Botswana with a slightly different variation played in Lesotho. This game is known by many names in many languages, including mlabalaba, mmela (in Setswana), muravava and umlabalaba. The game is similar to twelve men's morris, a variation on the Roman board game nine men's morris, which was based on the Egyptian game. The earliest known diagram of Morabaraba was found in an Egyptian temple in Kurna, Egypt, dating back to around 1440 BC. Other boards have been discovered in Ceylon / Sri Lanka (c. AD 10).
