= Tant fant =

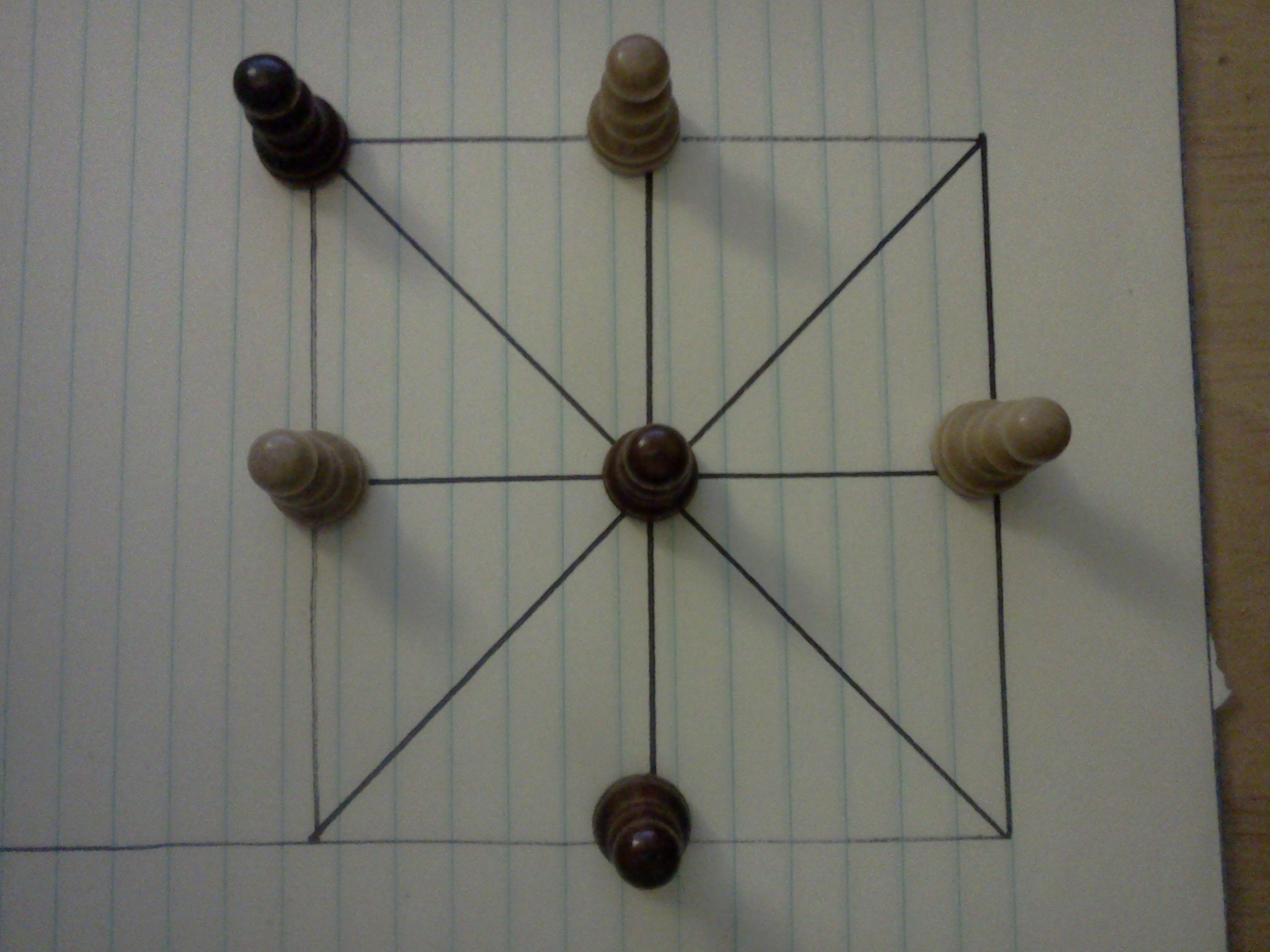
A game of tant fant being played with pawns on an improvised board

Tant fant is a two-player abstract strategy game from India. It is related to tic-tac-toe, but more closely related to three men's morris, nine holes, achi, shisima, and dara, because pieces are moved on the board to create the 3 in a row. It is an alignment game.

Tant fant uses the same board as tapatan and achi, and have very similar rules and game play. The difference is that in tant fant the pieces are lined up initially on each player's side (referred to as "home row" in this article). Furthermore, players cannot win with a 3 in a row formed with their own pieces in their home row.

There are two versions to this game. The standard version allows a player to make any kind of 3 in a row (horizontal, vertical, diagonal) except in one's home row. The second version is more challenging, and allows only for diagonal 3 in a rows.

== Goal ==
Version 1 (standard): To create a 3 in a row of one's pieces either horizontally, vertically, or diagonally. 3 in a rows formed in the player's home row with their own pieces do not count.

Version 2: To create a diagonal 3 in a row.

== Equipment ==
A 3 x 3 board is used. Three horizontal lines form the three rows. Three vertical lines form the three columns. Two diagonal lines connect the two opposite corners of the board. Each player has 3 pieces. One plays the black pieces, and the other plays the white pieces, however, any two colors or distinguishable objects will suffice.

The board is easily drawn on the ground or paper.

== Gameplay ==
1. Players decide what colors to play, and who will start first.
2. Each player's pieces are initially lined up on their side of the board called the home rank.
3. Each piece can move one space at a time following the pattern on the board. Only one piece can be moved per turn.
4. 3 in a rows formed in player's home row with their own pieces do not count.

When one player can no longer move, the game may be considered a loss for the player or a stalemate draw, depending on house rules. Repeating a position three times may also be considered a draw.

== Analysis ==
Analysis has shown that the game is a draw with perfect play.

== See also ==
- Achi (game)
- Dara (game)
- Nine holes
- Picaria
- Shisima
- Three men's morris
- Tic-tac-toe
