= International Council of Traditional Sports and Games =

The International Council of Traditional Sports and Games (ICTSG) is a non-governmental organisation that seeks to protect and promote traditional sports and games (TSG). With globally-coordinated efforts to preserve TSGs starting around 1990, the ICTSG was proposed in 2018 at the 4th UNESCO Collective Consultation on Traditional Sports and Games held at Istanbul, Turkey. The ICTSG organises global and continental games, and hosts the ICTSG Online Encyclopedia of Traditional Sports and Games.

== Member federations ==
The following are autonomous member federations of the ICTSG, along with each of their scopes with their country of origin in parentheses:

- Sport Jiu-Jitsu International Federation (SJJIF) – Jujutsu (Japanese)
- Asian Pencak Silat Federation (APSF) – Pencak Silat (Indonesian)
- World Silambam Federation (WSF) – Silambam (Indian)
- International Qazak Kuresi Federation (IQKF) – Qazak Kuresi (Kazakh)
- World Federation of Kowat Alrami (WFKA) – Kowat Al-Rami (Arab martial art)
- Pakistan Council of Traditional Sports and Games (PCTSG) – TSG in Pakistan
- International Zurkhaneh Sports and Koshti Pahlavani Federation (IZSF) – Zurkhaneh (Iranian)
- Mongolian Traditional Archery Federation (MTAF) – Mongolian traditional archery
- Mongolian National Horse Racing Association (MNHRA) – Mongolian traditional horse racing
- World Federation of Massage (WFM) – Therapeutic massage arts
- Tatar Democratic Union (TDU) – Tatar TSG
- Japan Council of Traditional Sports and Games (JCTSG) – TSG in Japan
- Committee of Mongolian National Sports (CMNS) – TSG in Mongolia
- African Traditional Sports and Games Council (ATSGC) – TSG in Africa
