= Dala (game) =

Sudanese strategy board game

Dala is a two-player abstract strategy board game from Sudan, and played especially by the Baggara tribes. The game is also called Herding the Cows (or Herding the Bulls). It is an alignment game with captures similar to that of the game Dara. Players first drop their pieces onto the board, and then move them (herding the cows) orthogonally in an attempt to form 3 in-a-rows which allows a player to capture any of their opponent's piece on the board.

== Goal ==
The player who reduces their opponent's number of pieces to two is the winner. The opponent can no longer form a 3-in-a-row with two pieces or fewer.

== Equipment ==
A 6x6 square board is used. Each player has a set of 12 pieces of which one set is black, and the other is white.

Traditionally, the board was played on a raised soft mud, and the lines of the board were drawn onto it and marked by holes called "Nugar". Each player had 12 sharpened sticks that would be placed into the holes during play. To differentiate the sticks, the bark was removed on one set of the sticks, while the other set would retain its bark.

== Game play ==
Players decide who will play the black and white pieces, and who will start first.

A 3 in-a-row is defined as exactly three pieces of the same color adjacent to one another in an orthogonal direction. The player who forms the 3 in-a-row is allowed to capture one of their opponent's piece from anywhere on the board. This is known as a "ta'na". 4 in-a-rows or more are allowed to be created, but do not allow the player forming it to capture a piece from their opponent. The 3 in-a-row must be in an orthogonal direction, and therefore, diagonal 3 in-a-rows do not count also.

Two or more 3 in-a-rows can be formed in a single move by a player, however, it may only allow that player to capture a single piece from their opponent. No source clearly clarifies this matter.

The Drop Phase is the first stage of the game. Players alternate their turns placing each of their 12 pieces, one piece per turn, onto the board. However, the four central squares of the board must first be filled. Afterwards, players may place their pieces on any vacant square on the board. During the Drop Phase, players can form 3 in-a-rows which allows for that player to capture an enemy piece from anywhere on the board.

After each player has dropped their 12 pieces, the Movement Phase begins. Players alternate their turns moving one piece orthogonally onto a vacant adjacent square. The piece can form a 3 in-a-row by either moving onto a row or column of two adjacent pieces of its color, or leaving a row or column of four adjacent pieces of its color and thus leaving behind three adjacent pieces in-a-row.

A special situation exist when a player has three of their pieces (that are adjacent to each other) on a row next to another row of two adjacent pieces (of the player's also) whereby one of the pieces of the former row can move back and forth between the two rows to form a 3 in-a-row on every turn, and thus capture a piece from the opponent on every turn. This situation is known as a "bull".

== Related Games ==
- Dara
- Nine men's morris
- Square chess
