= Achi (game) =

Strategy board game for two players

Achi gameboard

Achi is a two-player abstract strategy game from Ghana. It is also called tapatan. It is related to tic-tac-toe, but even more related to three men's morris, Nine Holes, Tant Fant, Shisima, and Dara, because pieces are moved on the board to create the 3-in-a-row. Achi is an alignment game.

There are two versions of this game. In one version, each player has four pieces to drop. This is the version described below. In another version, each player has only three pieces to drop, which makes it identical to three men's morris.

== Equipment ==
A 3×3 board is used. Three horizontal lines form the three rows. Three vertical lines form the three columns. Two diagonal lines connect the two opposite corners of the board. The board is easily drawn on the ground or paper.

Each player has four pieces. One plays the black pieces, and the other plays the white pieces; however, any two colors or distinguishable objects will suffice.

== Rules and gameplay ==
1. The players take turns to place one of their counters on a point where lines join.
2. When all eight counters have been placed, each player can move along a line to an adjacent empty point.

The winner is the first player to create a 3-in-a-row of one's counters either horizontally, vertically, or diagonally. If a player can't move, then he loses.

A variation is that a player doesn't win by getting 3 pieces aligned diagonally - only horizontally or vertically.

== See also ==
- Picaria
- Three men's morris, also called Tapatan—a cited predecessor
- Nine Holes
