= Shisima =

Two-player abstract strategy game from Kenya

Shisima is a two-player abstract strategy game from Kenya. It is related to tic-tac-toe, and even more so to three men's morris, Nine Holes, Achi, Tant Fant, and Dara, because pieces are moved on the board to create the 3-in-a-row. Unlike those other games, Shisima uses an octagonal board.

Shisima means "body of water" in some language spoken in Kenya. The pieces are called imbalavali which translates to "water bugs" as the pieces move quickly on the board as water bugs do on the surface of a lake.

== Setup ==
The board consist of an octagon, and four diametrical lines connecting each corner of the octagon to its opposite corner. The four diametrical lines intersect at the middle of the octagon forming the central intersection point of the board. Each of the eight corners of the octagon is also an intersection point, therefore there is a total of 9 intersection points (here-in-forth called "points").

Each player has 3 pieces. One plays the black pieces, and the other plays the white pieces. Alternatively, any two colors or small objects differentiated in another way will suffice.

Each player places their 3 pieces on three successive vacant points along the octagon's perimeter. There must be a vacant point on both ends of each player's set of pieces. This leaves three vacant points at the beginning of the game including the central point of the board.

== Rules ==
- Players alternate their turns
- A player may move one of their pieces to an adjacent vacant point on the board along a marked line in a turn.
- The first player to make a "three-in-a-row" with one's pieces along a diametrical line wins the game.
- Repeating a position three times is a draw.

== Variants ==
Rota was proposed to be an old Roman game by Elmer Truesdell Merrill in his article "An Old Roman Game" in The Classical Journal (1916). Merrill observed that there were several diagrams scratched into the steps and pavements of Roman buildings in the design of a wheel. He conjectured that they were games and of the tic-tac-toe variety, and conjectured the rules for the game since no rules had been discovered. He also named the game Rota but its actual name is unknown. The game as described by him is almost the same as that of Shisima, except that in Rota each player may place one of their pieces in turn on any vacant intersection point at the beginning part of the game, and it is only when a player has placed all of his 3 pieces on the board that he may begin to move them; whereas in Shisima the initial positions are pre-determined thus causing the movement phase commence at the beginning. He does not mention if game pieces were ever discovered with any of the wheel diagrams. He does mention that the first player can win every time if played optimally.

== Related games ==
- Achi
- Dara (game)
- Nine Holes
- Picaria
- Tant Fant
- Three men's morris
- tic-tac-toe
