= Abbia (game) =

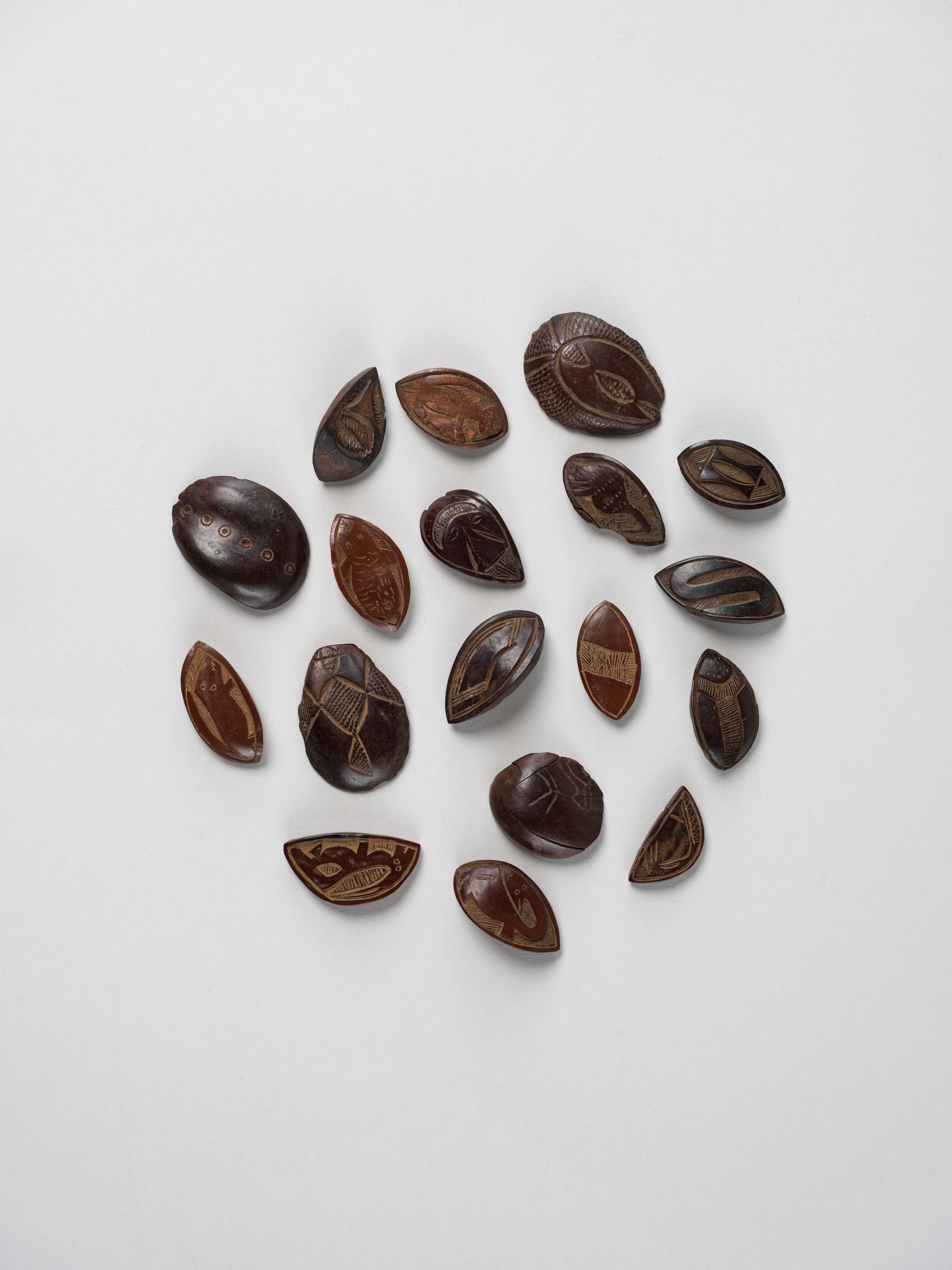
Abbie game pieces, Cameroon, 19th–20th century.

Abbia is an African game of chance among Cameroon's Beti people. The game is played using nutshells, or the carved fruit of a highly poisonous tree. Gambling chips made from stone are exchanged during the process. The nut is cracked, and the game stones are carved. Objects are depicted on each stone, decided by the carver, and can be of inanimate objects, living beings, or supernatural beings.

An experienced player mediates the game. The game was played by men who sat in a circle around a plate-shaped woven basket and placed their carved stones in the basket, along with other objects known as sa. Sa are undecorated discs cut from the peel of the calabash, the outer shell. The mediator throws the basket upside down and bets are placed on the positions of the objects, with various arrangements of objects turned carved side-up or down determining winners. The stakes are usually high, and men would lose wives or even gamble themselves into slavery.
