= Wali (game) =

Wali is a two-player abstract strategy game from Africa. It is unknown specifically which African country the game originates from. Players attempt to form a 3 in-a-row of their pieces, and in doing so capture a piece from their opponent. The game has two phases: Drop Phase and Move Phase. Players first drop as many of their pieces as possible in the Drop Phase, then move them to form 3 in-a-rows which allows them to capture the other player's pieces in the Move Phase.

The game is closely related to Dara. The main differences is that in Wali that a player cannot drop a piece on the board orthogonally adjacent to one of his or her own piece already on the board.

== Goal ==
The player who captures all of their opponent's pieces is the winner. Captures are accomplished by forming 3 in-a-rows of their own pieces.

== Equipment ==
A 5 x 6 square grid is used which makes for 30 intersection points. Each player has 12 pieces. One plays the black pieces, and the other the white pieces. The pieces are played on the intersection points.

== Game Play and Rules ==
1. The board is empty in the beginning. The pieces are set beside the board.

2. Players decide what colors to play, and who starts first. Players alternate their turns.

3. Drop Phase: Players drop a piece onto a vacant point on the board that is not orthogonally adjacent to a piece of their own already on the board. A player may only drop one piece per turn. Players must continue to drop pieces until they can no longer do so according to the rule. If a player can no longer drop a piece, that player must pass their turn until the other player can no longer drop a piece also.

4. Move Phase: Both players are only allowed to move their pieces after both players can no longer continue to drop their pieces in the Drop Phase. This may mean that they still have a reserve of their pieces next to the board. It is uncertain, however, whether the remaining pieces in each player's reserve is ever dropped on the board later.

A piece moves one space orthogonally onto a vacant point on the board. Players who form a 3 in-a-row with their own pieces can remove any an opponent's piece from the board. The 3 in-a-row must strictly consist three pieces (no more and no less) in order to allow the player to capture an enemy piece.

It seems that 4 or more in-a-rows are allowed in this game even though they do not allow a player to capture an enemy piece. In Dara they are strictly prohibited throughout the game. During the Drop Phase a 3 in-a-row is impossible since it would require placing two orthogonally adjacent pieces. In Dara, 3 in-a-rows formed in the Drop Phase do not count, and therefore do not allow a player to capture an enemy piece on the board. It is also uncertain whether a player can capture an enemy piece that is part of a 3 in-a-row itself. In Dara, this is also prohibited. It is also uncertain how many enemy pieces a player can capture if in one move a player forms two or more 3 in-a-rows. In Dara, only one enemy piece is allowed to be captured per turn. Lastly, it is also uncertain whether diagonal 3 in-a-rows count. In Dara they do not count, only orthogonal 3 in-a-rows count.

== Related Games ==
- Dara (game)
