= Pilolo =

Ghanaian kids outdoor game

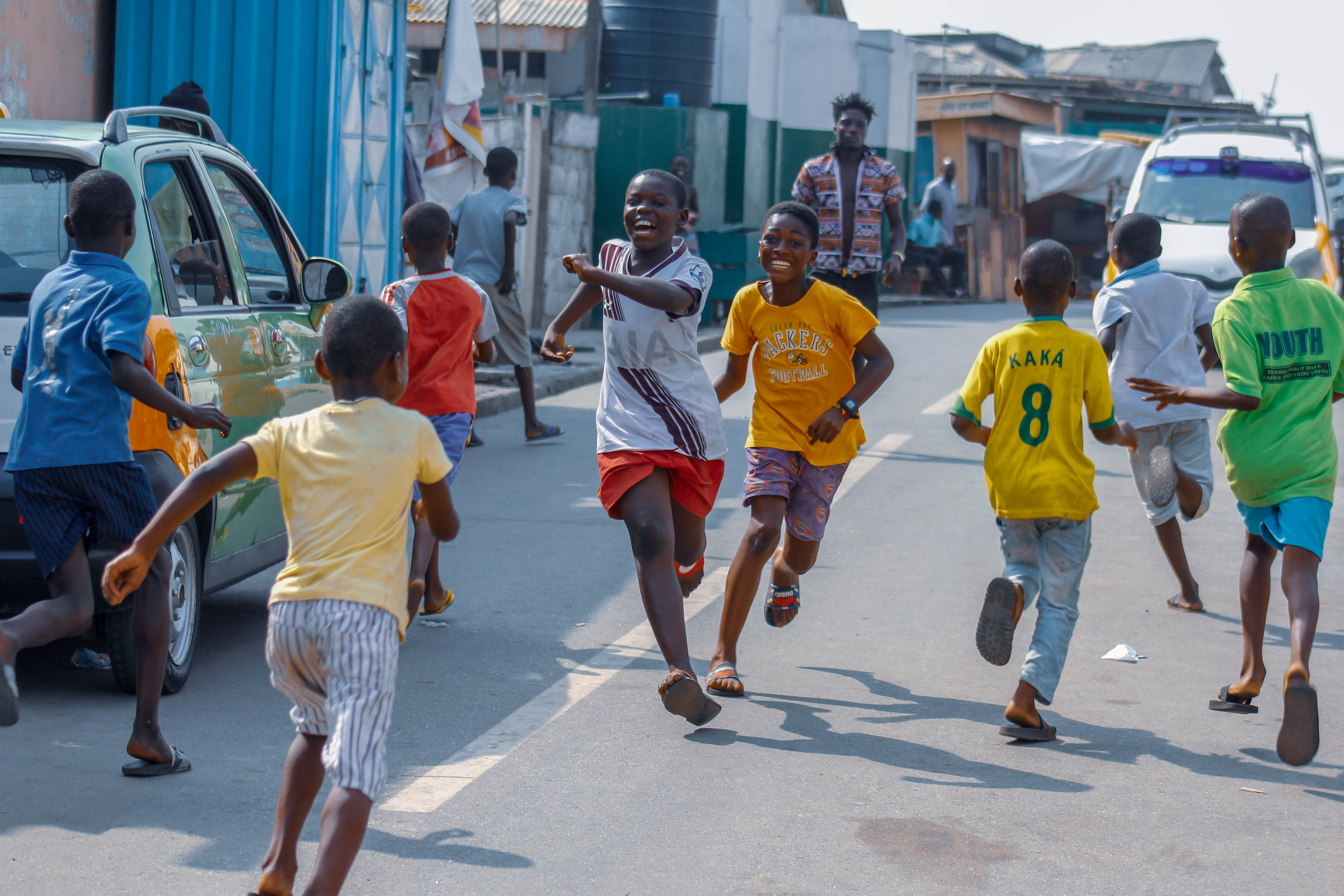
- Children running with excitement after finding the hidden object

Characteristics
- Contact: Yes (with hands & feet)
- Team members: Individuals, doubles and teams of variable size
- Mixed-sex: Yes
- Type: Outdoor
- Equipment: Broken Sticks
- Venue: Any playfield

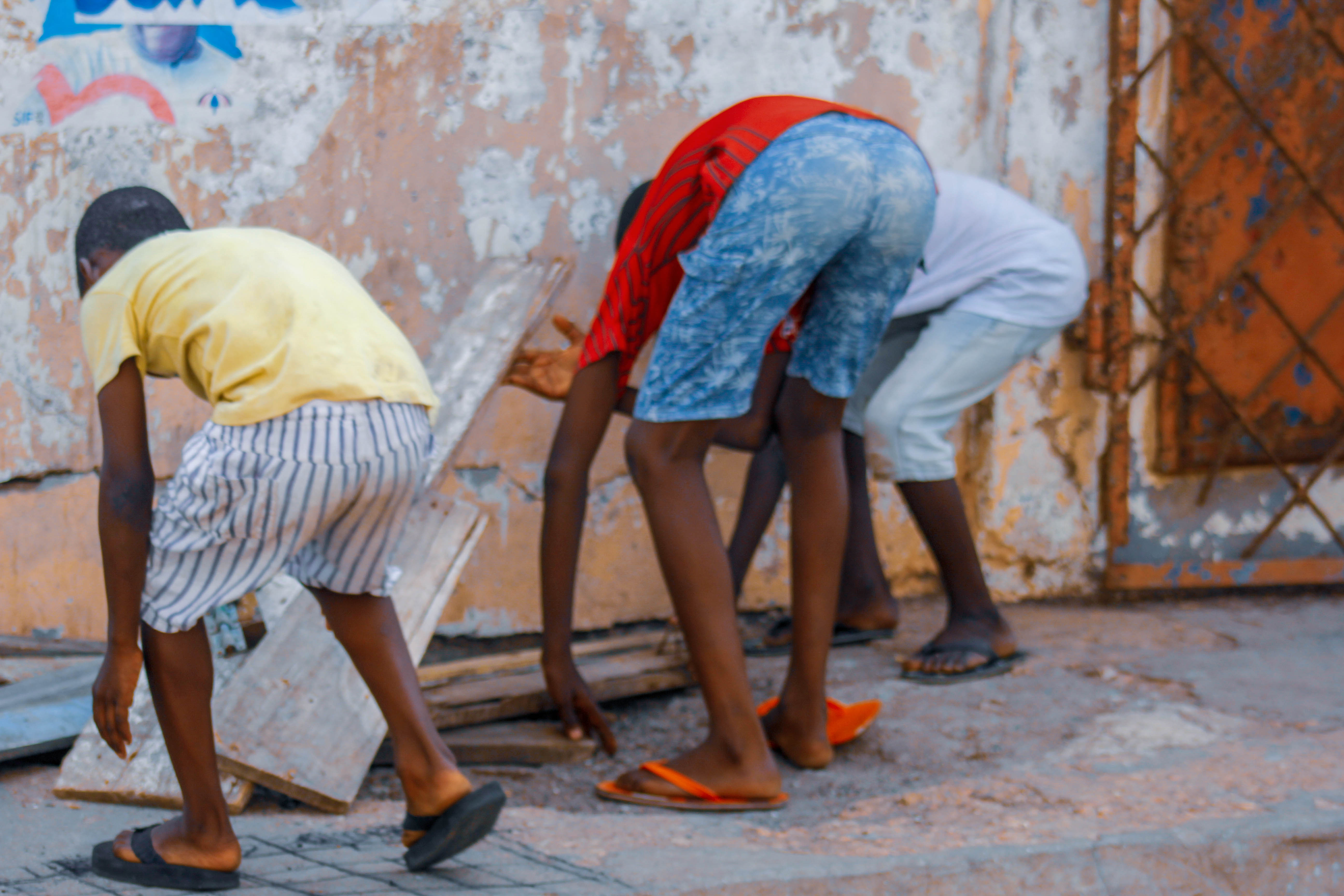
Children in search of the hidden object

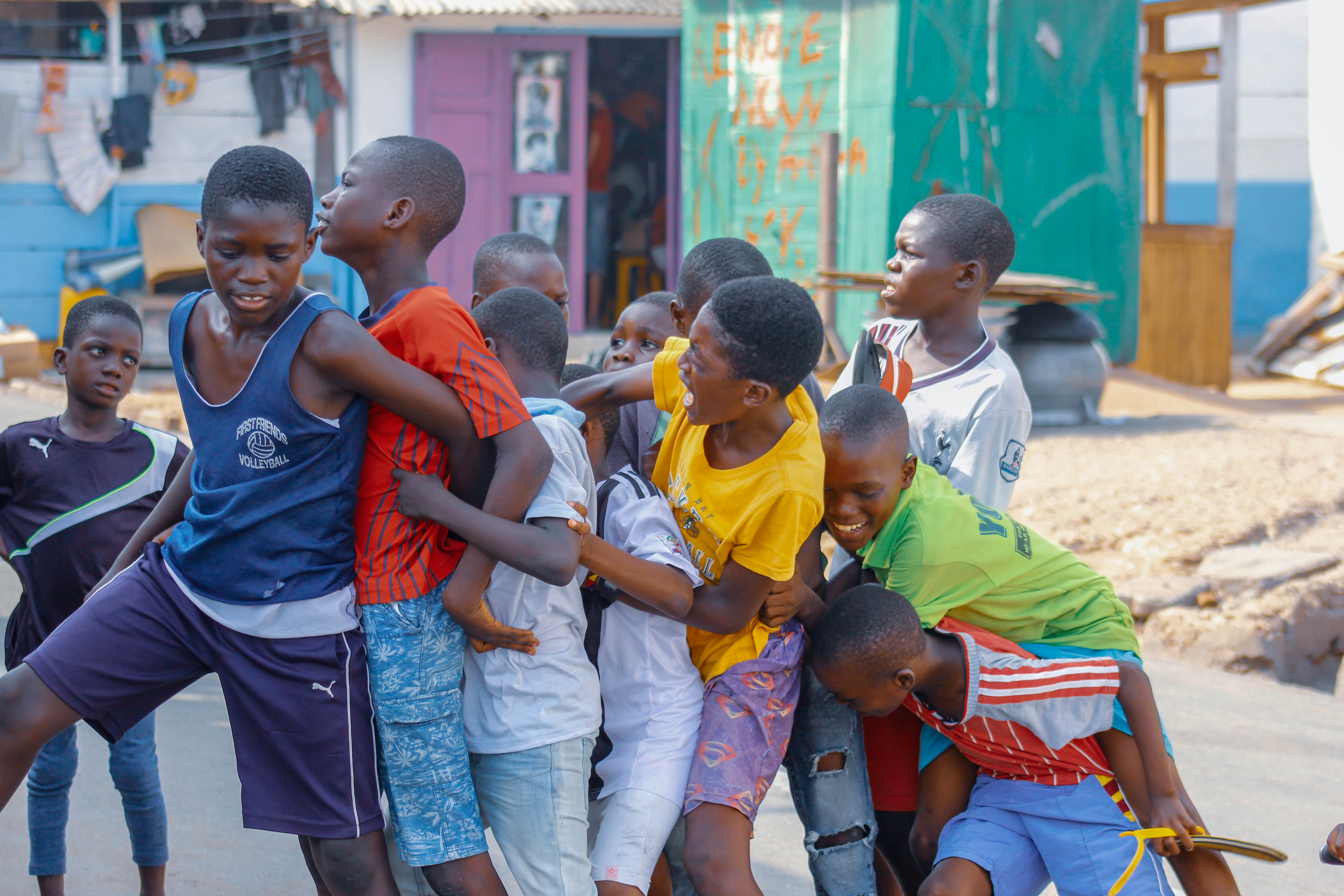
Children struggling to join the finishing queue

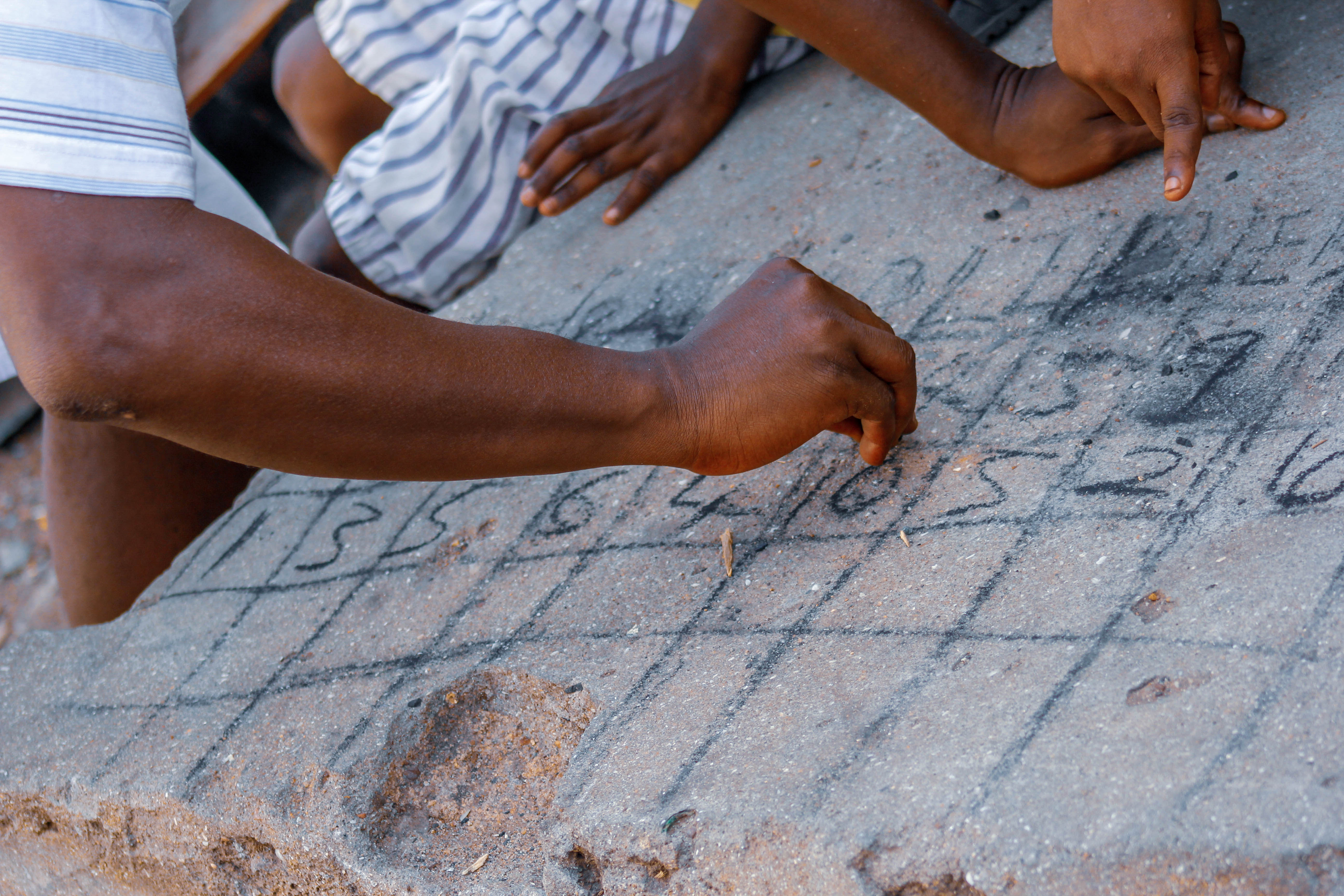
Positions written on the floor with charcoal

Pilolo is an outdoor game that is played among Ghanaian children. The literal English translation of the name is "time to search for". The Pilolo game is played by two or more children. The higher the number, the increase in excitement and zeal to win. An object like a stick is mostly used and the number of sticks to use is dependent on the number of children.

A non-participant hides the sticks while the participants have either closed their eyes or are not in the same location. The participant then shouts out "pi-lo-lo", the participants then run from their hideout to search for the item. A finishing point is indicated where they must send the stick to be a winner.

One needs to be smart, observant and skillful to detect where the item has been hidden. The first person that sees it secretly runs to the finish point before alerting the others after a hard time trying. It is then recorded as they reach the finish point.

== Rules ==
The game is played among two or more children. When ten children have decided to play, one kid is chosen to be the leader of the game. The leader searches for small pieces of sticks. The game starts when the leader tells the other kids to hide. The leader either ensures that they are facing a wall or asks somebody to watch them so that they do not peek.

The leader may hide the sticks under stones, on top of short trees, in the grass, or even leave one on the ground just in front of the kids who are waiting. The sticks are generally hidden in a place that is convenient but not easy to find. When the sticks are hidden, the leader shouts "pilolo", and the kids run to search for the hiding sticks. As they search for the sticks they sing a song. One popular song which is sung is "pilolo yafo be mli", a Ghanaian song that literally means "pilolo nobody is expected to cry". A kid who finds a small piece of the stick first may pretend to have not seen it or may pick it up fast when the others are not watching and run to touch the leader. The others would have to do the same. The child who finds the stick is then given a point.
