= Fire on the Mountain (game) =

Game played by children in Tanzania

- Players: 5+

Fire on the Mountain is a game played by children in Tanzania.

This game can be played about people of all ages. You need at least 5 players for this game to work. The aim of the game is to be the player who stays in the game the longest..

- To start the game, first choose a player to be the leader.
- Players think of a 'key word'. It can be any word or a name. For example, 'cheese'.
- All players lie on their backs.
- The leader shouts out "Fire on the mountain!" All the players respond with "Fire!" but stay lying down. Then the leader shouts out "Fire on the river!" Again the players reply with "Fire" but do not jump up. This continues on with the leader changing the last word of the phrase. He tries to think of as many different places for the fire.
- The leader is able to shout out the key word at any time, as part of the phrases or in between them. When he shouts it out the players must all jump up. The last one to jump up is out of the game.
- The winner is the player who stays in the game the longest.

== See also ==
- Simon Says
