= Three men's morris =

Abstract strategy game

Three men's Morris
- Players: 2
- Setup time: < 1 minute
- Playing time: < 1 hour
- Chance: None
- Skills: Strategy

Three men's morris is an abstract strategy game played on a three by three board (counting lines) that is similar to tic-tac-toe. It is also related to six men's morris and nine men's morris. A player wins by forming a mill, that is, three of their own pieces in a row.

== Rules ==
A board for three men's morris. This pattern has been found carved into the roof of the temple of Kurna.

Each player has three pieces. The winner is the first player to align their three pieces on a line drawn on the board. There are 3 horizontal lines, 3 vertical lines and 2 diagonal lines.

The board is empty to begin the game, and players take turns placing their pieces on empty intersections. Once all pieces are placed (assuming there is no winner by then), play proceeds with each player moving one of their pieces per turn. A piece may move to any vacant point on the board, not just an adjacent one.

According to H. J. R. Murray’s A History of Chess, there is an alternative version in which pieces may not move to any vacant point, but only to any adjacent linked empty position, i.e. from a corner to the middle of an adjacent edge, from the middle of an edge to the center or an adjacent corner, or from the center to the middle of an edge. Murray calls the first version "nine holes" and the second version "three men's morris" or "the smaller merels". In this variant of the game, there is a winning strategy for the player who goes first, unless the first player is not allowed to place the first piece in the centre, in which case neither player has a winning strategy.

== History ==
According to R. C. Bell, the earliest known board for the game includes diagonal lines and was "cut into the roofing slabs of the temple at Kurna in Egypt"; he estimated a date for them of c. 1400 BCE. However, Friedrich Berger wrote that some of the diagrams at Kurna include Coptic crosses, making it "doubtful" that the diagrams date to 1400 BCE. Berger concluded, "certainly they cannot be dated." When played on this board, the game is called tapatan in the Philippines and luk tsut k'i ('six man chess') in China. It is thought that luk tsut k'i was played during the time of Confucius, c. 500 BCE. Centuries later, the game was mentioned in Ovid's Ars Amatoria, according to R. C. Bell. In book III (c. 8 CE), after discussing latrones, a popular board game, Ovid wrote:

Est genus, in totidem tenui ratione redactum
Scriptula, quot menses lubricus annus habet:
Parva tabella capit ternos utrimque lapillos,
In qua vicisse est continuasse suos.
Mille facesse iocos; turpe est nescire puellam
Ludere: ludendo saepe paratur amor.

There is another game divided into as many parts as there are months in the year. A table has three pieces on either side; the winner must get all the pieces in a straight line. It is a bad thing for a girl not to know how to play, for love often comes into being during play.

Boards were carved into the cloister seats at the English cathedrals at Canterbury, Gloucester, Norwich, Salisbury and Westminster Abbey; the game was quite popular in England in the 13th century. These boards used holes, not lines, to represent the nine spaces on the board—hence the name nine-holes—and forming a diagonal row did not win the game.

The name of the game may be related to Morris dances (and hence to Moorish). However, according to Daniel King, "the word 'morris' has nothing to do with the old English dance of the same name. It comes from the Latin word merellus, which means a counter or gaming piece."

== Related games ==
- Six men's morris and nine men's morris use six and nine pieces, respectively, and are played on different boards.
- In tic-tac-toe, pieces are placed (or marks are made) until the board is full; if neither player has an orthogonal or diagonal line at this point, the game is a draw.
- Extended tic-tac-toe, like the three men's morris game, each player has three pieces, but when moving pieces, players must first move their first pieces, then the second pieces, then the third pieces, then the first pieces, and so on. This game is harder than both tic-tac-toe and three men's morris, but the first player has a way to win by taking the edge first. Alternatively, by taking the center or corner first, the game will be drawn.
- Tapatan, from the Philippines, the same game with additional rule that pieces can only move to adjacent spaces.
- Marelle, from France, the same game with additional rule that pieces can only move to adjacent spaces and the center space (central intersection point) cannot be used until after each player drops their first piece.
- Tant Fant, from India, the same game with additional rule that pieces can only move to adjacent spaces and the pieces are already dropped before the game is started.
- Achi, from Ghana, the same game with additional rule that pieces can only move to adjacent spaces, and each player has four (instead of three) pieces.
- Picaria, a Native American variation invented in New Mexico, adds diagonal attachments to the central edge points, yielding four additional interior points each located between the center and corner points, may have 9 or 13 spaces, the center space (central intersection point) cannot be used until after each player drops their first piece (a variant is the center space cannot be used after all pieces are dropped).
- Rota is an allegedly Roman-era variation of this game played on a circular board, codified in an article published in 1916 by Latin scholar Elmer Truesdell Merrill. See also Shisima, a Kenyan variant.
