= Jukskei =

South African folk sport

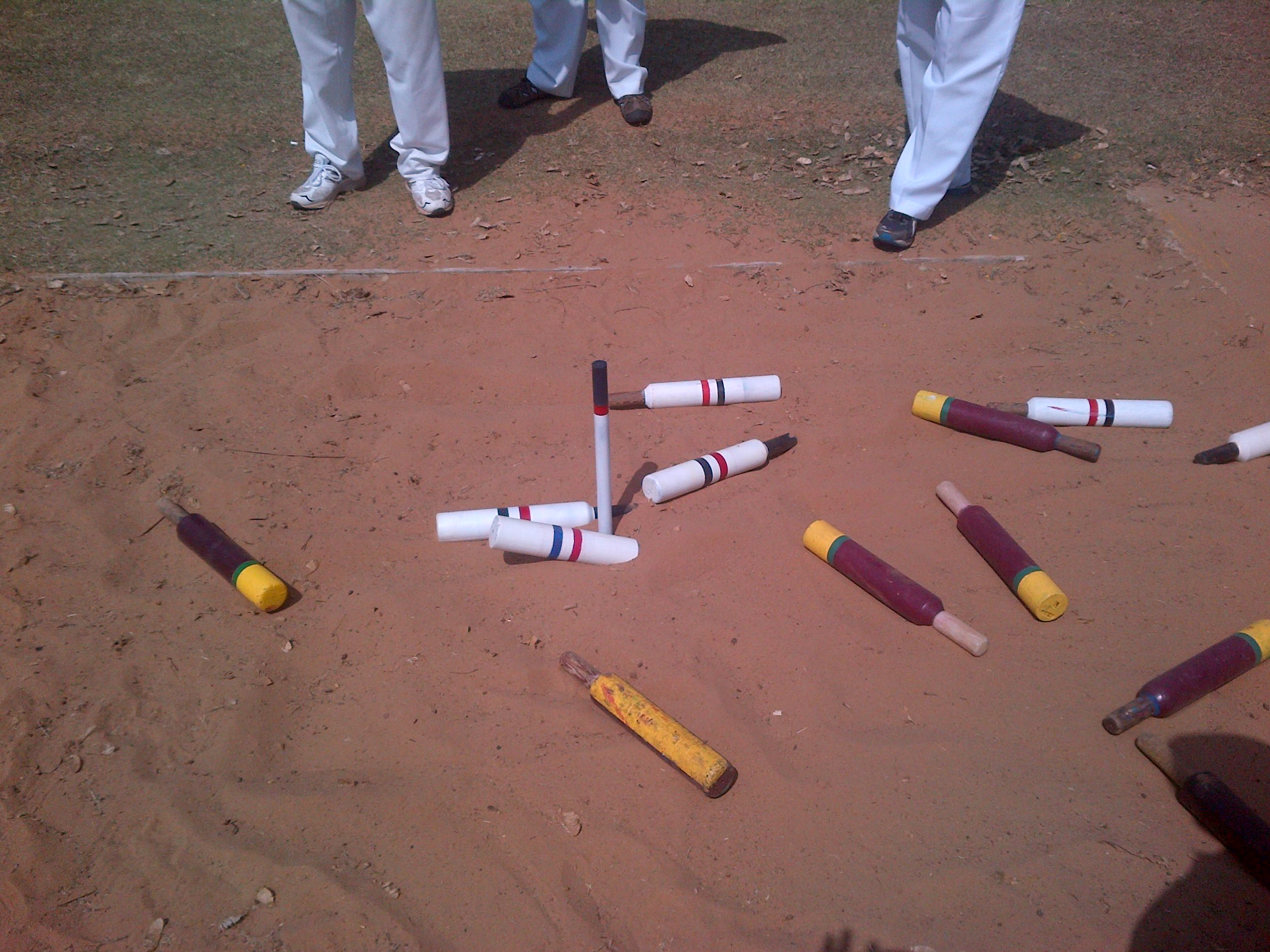
- Classic jukskei game
- Highest governing body: International Jukskei Federation

Characteristics
- Equipment: Wooden skey, pegs, calliper, cross string
- Venue: Jukskei court

Presence
- Country or region: South Africa, Namibia, US

Jukskei is a folk sport (Afrikaans: Boeresport) developed and played in South Africa.

== History ==
Jukskei is believed to have originated around 1743 in the Cape of Good Hope, South Africa, developed by "transport riders" who travelled with ox-drawn wagons. They used the wooden pins of the yokes (Afrikaans: juk, lit. 'yoke' and skei, 'divider') of the oxen to throw at a stick that was planted into the ground. The game was also played during the Great Trek. It was also played by the farmers from the Boland on beaches.

Jukskei became an organised sport around the year 1939, when the first unions were established and rules were formalised.

== Today ==
The sport is traditionally associated with the Afrikaners and in 2001 it was chosen by the SA government as one of the sports to be included in the Indigenous Games Project. Since then the game has started to gain popularity with young people of all cultures. There is usually a team of 4 players, of whom one is the captain, but it can also be played in pairs or singles. Jukskei in South Africa is played at schools, club and provincial level, and there is an annual tournament in Kroonstad in the Free State. Jukskei is also being played in Namibia and the USA. The three countries are affiliated to the International Jukskei Federation (IJF).

== Basic rules ==
Dimensions of a Jukskei field - distances given to closest pin; 9m between pins

The object of the game is to knock over a peg that is planted in a sandpit over a distance of between 10 and 16 meters (depending on age and gender). It is played in teams with usually four members each. Each member has two skeis (and thus two turns). The playing field consists of two pits juxtaposed in opposite directions, so that play can take place in both directions. Each time a team member knocks over the peg, he gets three points. If the peg wasn't knocked out, the team lying closest to the position of the peg scores as many points as they have skeis closer to the peg than their opponent's closest skei. The first team to get exactly 23 points first wins the game. If the team gets more than 23 points, they start from 0.

== See also ==
- Quoits
