= Dara (game) =

Game played in Niger and Nigeria

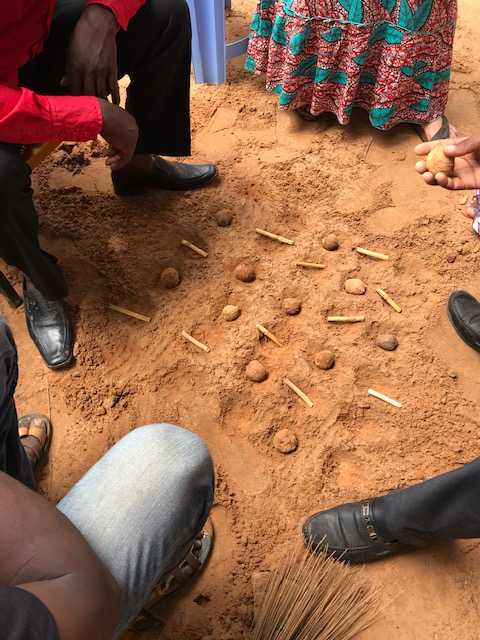
Two West Africans playing Dara in Niger

Dara is a two-player abstract strategy board game played in several countries of West Africa. In Nigeria it is played by the Dakarkari people. It is popular in Niger among the Zarma, who call it dili, and it is also played in Burkina Faso. In the Hausa language (Niger and Nigeria), the game is called doki which means horse. It is an alignment game related to tic-tac-toe, but far more complex. The game was invented in the 19th century or earlier. The game is also known as derrah and is very similar to Wali and Dama Tuareg.

== Goal ==
To form three-in-a-rows, and eliminate enough of your opponent's pieces so that they can no longer form three-in-a-rows.

== Equipment ==
The board is a 5x6 square board. Each player has 12 pieces. One player plays Black and the other plays White, however, any two colors will do. In Niger, people simply dig out 30 holes in the sand; one side takes doum nuts, the other short sticks.

== Game play and rules ==
1. Players decide among themselves who starts first.
2. The board is empty in the beginning. Players take turn placing their stones onto the empty cells of the square board. This is known as Phase 1 of the game or the Drop phase.
3. After all 24 stones have been dropped, Phase 2 or the Move phase begins. Players will then take turns moving their pieces orthogonally into an adjacent empty cell.
4. Players attempt to make a three-in-a-row with their own pieces. The three-in-a-row must be orthogonal and not diagonal. Furthermore, it must be strictly three pieces in a row, and not four or more pieces in a row; four or more pieces formed in a row are illegal. If a three-in-a-row is made by a player, they can remove one enemy piece from the board which is not part of a three-in-a-row itself.
5. If a player can no longer make three-in-a-rows with their remaining pieces (e.g. if the player only has two pieces left), that player is the loser, and the other player is the winner.

Three-in-a-rows made during the Drop phase do not count. Therefore, a player cannot remove another player's stone during the Drop phase even if one were to make a three-in-a-row. (In Niger, it is not allowed to make a three-in-a-row during the Drop phase.) Moreover, the rule that four or more pieces in a row are illegal to form also applies in the Drop phase.

If a player were to successfully form two three-in-a-rows in one move during the Move phase, only one enemy piece can be removed.

== See also ==
- Dala (game)
- Tic-tac-toe
