= Cassidy (surname) =

Cassidy (Irish: Ó Caiside / Ó Casaide) is a common Irish surname and is sometimes used as a given name. The surname translates to "descendant of Caiside". Variations include: Cassady, Cassiday, Cassedy, Casadei and Cassedey. The family was originally a Munster sept called Uí Chaisín but in the 12th century a branch moved to Devenish Island in County Fermanagh, where they became a medical and poetic family, hereditary physicians to the Maguires.

== People ==
- Barrie Cassidy (born 1950), Australian journalist
- Bernard Matthew Cassidy (1892–1918), British soldier
- Bill Cassidy (born 1957), American politician and physician
- Bob Cassidy (1949–2017), mentalist, speaker and author
- Bruce Cassidy (born 1965), Canadian hockey coach
- Butch Cassidy (1866–1908), notorious Wild West criminal (née Robert LeRoy Parker)
- Christopher Cassidy (born 1970), American astronaut
- Claudia Cassidy (c. 1899–1996), American critic
- Colette Cassidy, former primetime newsbreak anchor for MSNBC
- Damian Cassidy (born 1965), Irish Gaelic footballer
- Daniel Cassidy (1943–2008), American writer, filmmaker and academic
- Daniel Cassidy (footballer) (1907–1995), English football player
- David Cassidy (1950–2017), American musician, actor and erstwhile teen idol of Partridge Family fame, son of Jack Cassidy
- Derek Cassidy (born 1986), American football player
- Donie Cassidy (born 1945), Irish politician and businessman
- Ed Cassidy (1923–2012), American drummer
- Edward Cassidy (1924–2021), Australian Roman Catholic cardinal
- Elaine Cassidy (disambiguation), several people
- Ellen Cassidy (1888-1960), American stage and screen actress
- Eva Cassidy (1963–1996), American singer
- George Cassidy (disambiguation), several people
- Harry Cassidy (1900–1951), Canadian academic and social reformer
- Jack Cassidy (1927–1976), Irish-American actor, father of David, Shaun and Patrick Cassidy
- James Cassidy (disambiguation), several people
- Joanna Cassidy (born 1945), American actress
- John Cassidy (disambiguation), several people
- Joseph Cassidy (disambiguation), several people named Joe or Joseph
- Katie Cassidy (born 1986), American singer and actress, daughter of David Cassidy
- Lewis C. Cassidy (1829–1889), Pennsylvania Attorney General
- Matthew Cassidy (born 1988), Irish footballer
- Michael Cassidy (disambiguation), several people
- Natalie Cassidy (born 1983), English soap actress
- Orange Cassidy (born 1984), ring name of American professional wrestler James Cipperly
- Owen Cassidy (1862–1911), New York politician
- Patrick Cassidy (disambiguation), several people
- Raffey Cassidy (born 2001), English child actress
- Raquel Cassidy (born 1968), English actress
- Scott Cassidy (born 1975), American baseball player
- Shaun Cassidy (born 1958), American celebrity, son of Jack Cassidy
- Stephen Cassidy, American labor leader
- Tania Cassidy, New Zealand professor of physical education
- Taylor Cassidy, African-American educator and TikToker
- Ted Cassidy (1932–1979), American actor
- Tommy Cassidy (1950–2024), Northern Ireland footballer
- Virginia Dell {Cassidy} Blythe Clinton Dwire Kelley (1923–1994), mother of US President Bill Clinton
- William F. Cassidy (1908–2002), American military

== Fiction ==
- Black Tom Cassidy, a Marvel Comics supervillain
- Brian Cassidy, a Law & Order: Special Victims Unit character
- Cole Cassidy, a character in the Blizzard Entertainment's 2016 video game Overwatch
- Hopalong Cassidy, a cowboy created by Clarence E. Mulford
- Kid Cassidy, a member of the Gunhawks
- Proinsias Cassidy, a vampire from the Vertigo comic book series Preacher
- Sean Cassidy, aka Banshee, Marvel Comics superhero
- Theresa Cassidy, aka Siryn, Marvel Comics superheroine

== See also ==
- Cassady (name), given name and surname
- Cassidy (given name)
