= Cassidy =

Cassidy may refer to:

== Personal names ==
- Cassidy (given name)
- Cassidy (surname)

== People ==
- Cassidy (musician) (born 1979), lead singer of Antigone Rising
- Cassidy (rapper) (born 1982), American rapper
- DJ Cassidy (born 1981), New York DJ

=== Fictional ===
- Cassidy (Overwatch), a fictional character in the Blizzard Entertainment's 2016 video game
- Cassidy (DC Comics), a vampire from the graphic novel Preacher
- Cassidy, role played by actor Sam Slovick in the television show Fame
- Charles Parnell Cassidy, a fictional premier of New South Wales in the novel and TV film Cassidy
- Cassidy, a fictional character from Five Nights at Freddy's
- Hopalong Cassidy, fictional cowboy

== Companies ==
- Casady & Greene, software company (1984–2003) that produced software for the Macintosh

== Other ==
- Cassidy, British Columbia, a settlement and airport in Canada
- Maggie Cassidy, a 1959 novel by Jack Kerouac
- Cassidy's Ltd., a defunct Canadian company
- "Cassidy" (song), a 1972 song by the Grateful Dead
- Cassidy (miniseries), a 1989 Australian miniseries based on a 1986 novel by Morris West

== See also ==
- Cassady (disambiguation)
