= Can't Stop (board game) =

1980 board game by Sid Sackson

- Sample "game in play"
- Designers: Sid Sackson
- Genres: Board game
- Players: 2–4
- Setup time: < 1 minute
- Playing time: 3–45 minutes
- Chance: Medium
- Age range: 10 to adult
- Skills: Strategy

Can't Stop is a board game designed by Sid Sackson originally published by Parker Brothers in 1980; however, that edition has been long out of print in the United States. It was reprinted by Face 2 Face Games in 2007. An iOS version was developed by Playdek and released in 2012. The goal of the game is to "claim" (get to the top of) three of the columns before any of the other players can. But the more that the player risks rolling the dice during a turn, the greater the risk of losing the advances made during that turn.

== Equipment ==
The game equipment consists of four dice, a board, a set of eleven markers for each player, and three neutral-colored markers.

The board consists of eleven columns of spaces, one column for each of the numbers 2 through 12. The columns (respectively) have 3, 5, 7, 9, 11, 13, 11, 9, 7, 5 and 3 spaces each. The number of spaces in each column roughly corresponds to the likelihood of rolling them on two dice.

== Rules ==
On each turn, the player rolls the four dice, then divides them into two pairs, adding up each pair. (For example, a player rolling a 1, 2, 3, and 6 could group them as 5 and 7, 4 and 8, or 3 and 9.) If the neutral markers are off the board, they are brought onto the board on the columns corresponding to these totals. If the neutral markers are already on the board in one or both of these columns, they are advanced one space upward. If the neutral markers are on the board, but only in columns that cannot be made with any pair of the current four dice, the turn is over and the player gains nothing. This is generally called 'going bust.'

After moving the markers, the player chooses whether or not to roll again. If the player stops, they put markers of their color in the location of the current neutral markers. If the player restarts this column on a later turn, they start building from the place where they previously placed their markers. If the player does not stop, they must be able to advance one of the neutral markers on their next roll, or lose any advancement made this turn.

When a player reaches the top space of a column and claims it then this column is won, and no further play in that column is allowed. A player claims three columns to win the game.

The official rules merely say "If you can place a marker, you must...", not stating if that applies before or after a player decides how to subdivide the four dice. This rule is potentially confusing for the following reason:

Suppose the player has a neutral marker in the 7-column, with two un-played. The player now rolls 2-2-5-5. Of course, the player wants to declare two sevens. The player still has an unplayed neutral marker, so is the rule interpreted such that the player must place their remaining two neutral markers, playing on 4 and 10? The rule may have only been intended to apply to requiring that all die-pairs be played, if possible. For instance, if the player rolls 3-4-1-2, they may choose to make a 7 and a 3, advancing their 7 marker, and they must also place their 3 marker even though they would prefer to hold it in reserve.

== Variants ==
Variants exist including Sid's own "Speed" variant, which results in players jumping over their opponents' markers. This variant leads to fast-paced gameplay and a shorter game.

For a slower variant, try "Blocking", where players are not allowed to end their turn if one of their markers is on top of another player's marker. Note that this variant makes it very difficult to pass a player with an established position on the columns on the side of the board (like 2 and 12).

Another game, Can't Stop Express, was published in 1989 by Hexagames. In Can't Stop Express, players roll dice to score points. A review for the Games International magazine commented that "Like most of Sid's games this is easy to learn yet offers considerable replay value."

== Reception ==
The game was recommended by the Spiel des Jahres jury in 1982, with the jury stating that "[with] Can't Stop, author Sid Sackson proves that he also knows how to use dice". The reviewer Mikko Saari from Lautapeliopas considered the game to be "very simple" and praised the engagement due to the push-your-luck mechanism.

== Reviews ==
- 1980 Games 100 in Games
- Games #21
- 1981 Games 100 in Games
- 1982 Games 100 in Games
- Jeux & Stratégie #9
- Family Games: The 100 Best
