= Sleuth =

Sleuth may refer to:

- Detective
- Sleuth, collective noun for a group of bears

== Computing ==
- The Sleuth Kit, a collection of forensic analysis software
- SLEUTH assembler language for the UNIVAC 1107

== Entertainment and media ==
- Cloo, formerly Sleuth, an American cable television channel owned by NBCUniversal
- Sleuth (Australian TV channel), formerly Fox Sleuth, an Australian cable channel owned by Foxtel
- The Sleuth (Disney), a fictional Disney character
- Sleuth (video game), a 1983 computer game
- Sleuth (card game), a 1967 card game

=== Theatre and film ===
- The Sleuth (film), a 1925 silent era film featuring Stan Laurel
- Sleuth (play), a 1970 play by Anthony Shaffer
  - Sleuth (1972 film), a film adaptation of the Anthony Shaffer play, directed by Joseph L. Mankiewicz
  - Sleuth (2007 film), a film adaptation of the Anthony Shaffer play, adapted by Harold Pinter and directed by Kenneth Branagh

== Vessels ==
- HMAS Sleuth, ships of the Royal Australian Navy
- HMS Sleuth (P261), a submarine of the Royal Navy, in service 1944–1958
