= Blue and Gray (board game) =

Strategy board game

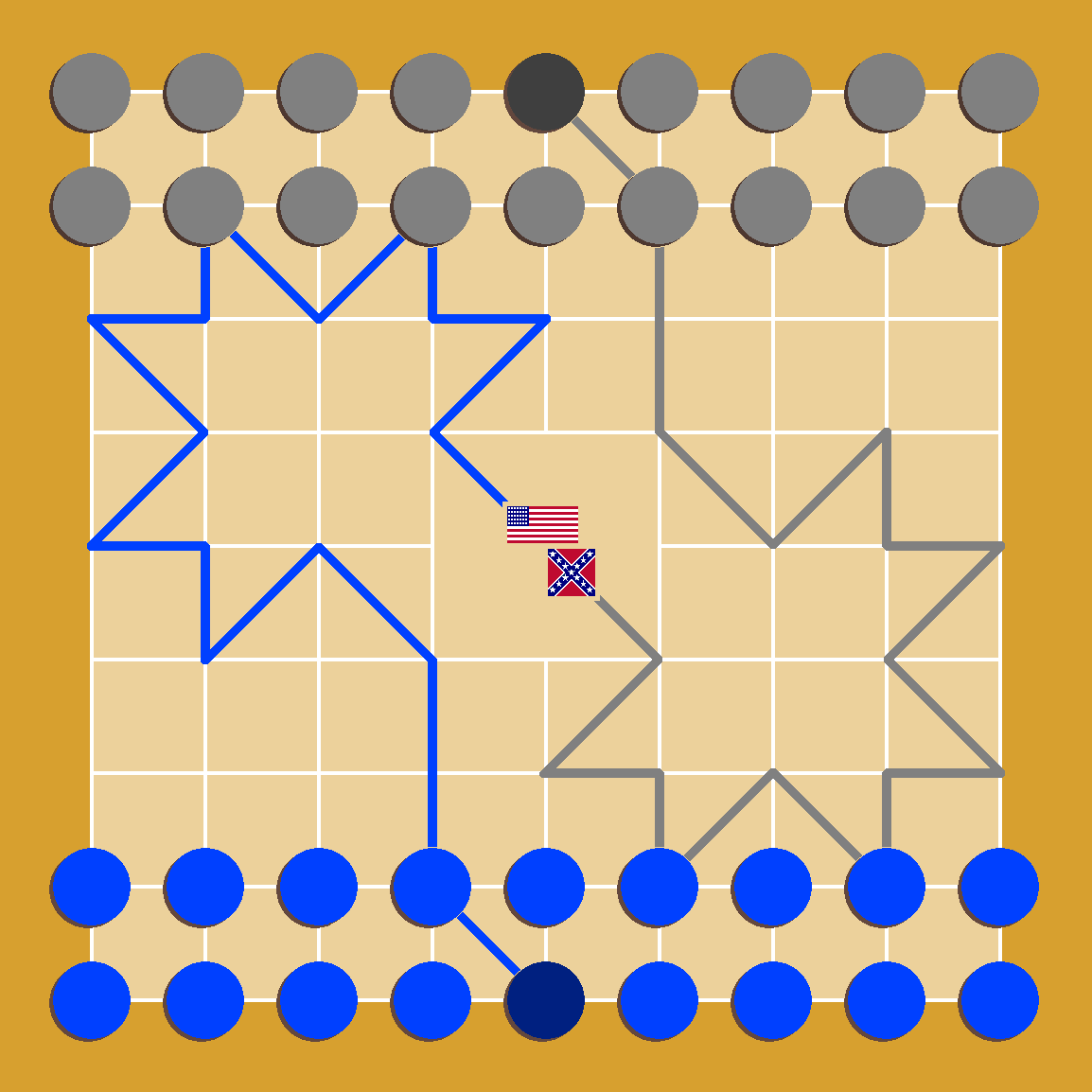
Blue and Gray gameboard and starting setup. In the illustration, captains are dark-colored; grid lines are white, blue, and gray.

Blue and Gray is a strategy board game for two players invented by Henry Busch and Arthur Jaeger in 1903. They obtained a patent for the game, but may never have published it. The name Blue and Gray "refers to the uniforms of the South and the North in the Civil War and in the original game the playing pieces of the contestants were of those colors." Blue and Gray is a variant of checkers. (Note: "[Blue and Gray] was, and is, a delightful pastime, which should particularly appeal to the Checkers fan who is looking for something different.")

Blue and Gray was featured in the book A Gamut of Games (1969) by Sid Sackson. It was also featured in The Book of Classic Board Games (1991) by Klutz Press under the name Cats and Dogs. In this book, the game was ranked among the top 15 board games of all time, including checkers, backgammon, Go, and mancala. The game is also known as Wild West, Thumps Game, and Captain and Soldiers.

== Equipment and setup ==
Each player owns 18 pieces: 1 captain and 17 guards. One army is colored blue; the other gray. The game is played on a 9×9 gridded board with 80 intersection points. Pieces start on the points on the first two ranks of each player's side. The captain is placed at the center of the first rank. The board is marked with grid paths for each player's captain to advance toward the center of the board.

== Game rules ==
- Players decide which colored army to play, and who moves first. Only one piece (captain or guard) can be moved per turn. Players alternate turns.
- The captain can advance one step along its marked grid to an adjacent empty point. If another piece occupies that point, the captain cannot move until the point is vacated. The captain cannot leave its grid path, and can only move forward along its grid toward the center of the board. The captain cannot capture, nor can it be captured.
- The guards move in any direction orthogonally or diagonally one step along any grid line to an adjacent empty point. Guards can capture as in draughts by jumping over an adjacent enemy guard and landing on the empty point immediately beyond, in a straight line. Guards cannot jump a captain. Jumps are mandatory, including multiple successive jumps, if possible. A multi-jump can consist of jumps in different directions. If more than one guard can jump, the player can choose which guard to jump with.
- Guards may not enter the marked center of the board.

=== Winning ===
The winner is the first player to advance their captain along its marked grid into the specially marked center of the board. Each player will use their guards to try to block the advance of the enemy captain. If both captains are blocked and "neither player is able to break the impasse", the player whose captain has advanced farthest wins.
