= Can't Stop Express =

Board game

- Designers: Sid Sackson
- Publishers: Hexagames; Eagle-Gryphon Games
- Publication: 1989; 37 years ago
- Genres: Dice games
- Languages: English
- Players: 1-4
- Playing time: 30 minutes
- Age range: 10+

Can't Stop Express (also published as Choice) is a board game published in 1989 by Hexagames in which players strategize and score points using dice combinations.

== History ==
Can't Stop Express was designed by American board game designer Sid Sackson, as a re-publishing of Choice/Einstein, which was a republishing of his previously created game Solitaire Dice, first published in A Gamut of Games (1969). It was originally published by Hexagames until their closure in 1992, but is currently published by Eagle-Gryphon Games.

== Gameplay ==
At the start of every turn, five dice are rolled. Each player decides individually which four dice to use to make two pairs with the highest sums, which are recorded on their score sheet.

The "5th die" is also recorded in a separate space on the sheet. This has eight spaces for recording occurrences of that written die value as the 5th die. On following turns, players can either check off one of their written 5th die numbers or choose a new 5th die number, which they will then check off. Once a player has written down three 5th die numbers, no more can be written down and for each subsequent throw they must check one off if one of those numbers is available. Once a player has checked off all eight spaces for one of their 5th die numbers, the game ends for them.

The game is over when all players games have ended, and scores are tallied. Depending on the number of boxes filled in for a pair, the player is awarded plus or minus points based on a scoring system. The player with the highest score wins.

== Reception ==
Brian Walker reviewed Choice for Games International magazine, and gave it 4 stars out of 5, and stated that "Like most of Sid's games this is easy to learn yet offers considerable replay value."
