= Joseph Cassidy =

Joe or Joseph Cassidy is the name of:

- Joe Cassidy (baseball) (1883–1906), Major League Baseball infielder for the Washington Senators, 1904–1905
- Joe Cassidy (footballer, born 1872) (1872–?), Scottish footballer
- Joe Cassidy (footballer, born 1891) (1891–?), Irish footballer (Grimsby Town)
- Joe Cassidy (footballer, born 1896) (1896–1949), Scottish footballer
- Joe Cassidy (Gaelic footballer) (born 1977), Irish Gaelic footballer
- Joseph Cassidy (bishop) (1933–2013), Roman Catholic Archbishop of Tuam, Ireland
- Joseph Cassidy (priest) (1954–2015), Principal of St Chad's College, Durham
- Joseph Cassidy (politician) (c. 1860–1920), American politician from Queens, New York

== See also ==
- Cassidy (surname)
