= A Gamut of Games =

1969 book by Sid Sackson

A Gamut of Games is an innovative book of games written by Sid Sackson and first published in 1969. It contains rules for a large number of paper and pencil, card, and board games. Many of the games in the book had never before been published. It is considered by many hobbyist gamers to be an essential text for anyone interested in abstract strategy games, and a number of the rules were later expanded into full-fledged published board games.

Some of the games which were later sold separately include Focus, Property and Origins of World War I; Robert Abbott expanded his game Crossings, published here, into the more-refined title Epaminondas. Many of the games covered in the book were creations of Sid Sackson himself, who was a prolific game designer.

== Book sections ==
The sections of the book and the games covered therein are as follows:

=== In Search of Big and Little Games ===
- Blue and Gray, a board game by Henry Busch and Arthur Jaeger
- Hekaton, a card game originally published along with "Yankee Notion Cards" from the 19th century
- Le Truc, a revived French card game
- Mate, a card game by G. Capellen
- Plank, a serious revamp of the concepts in Tic-Tac-Toe
- Zetema, a Victorian card game similar to Bezique

=== Game Inventors Are People Too ===
Three Musketeers board layout
o	o	o	o	x
o	o	o	o	o
o	o	x	o	o
o	o	o	o	o
x	o	o	o	o

- Crossings, a board game by Robert Abbott; later turned into Epaminondas
- Cups, a mancala variant by Arthur and Wald Amberstone
- Knight Chase, a board game by Alex Randolph (inventor of games like TwixT)
- Lap, a complex progeny of Battleships by Lech Pijanowski
- Lines of Action, a board game by Claude Soucie
- Origins of World War I, a historical pencil-and-paper game by Jim Dunnigan which teaches players history
- Paks, a playing card game by Phil Laurence
- Skedoodle, a pencil-and-paper game by Father Daniel
- Three Musketeers, a board game by Haar Hoolim; notably, this game and the character in it was once used as the mascot for the Zillions of Games software product. Like the traditional game fox and geese, it uses the principle of unequal forces; the two players neither use the same types of pieces nor the same rules, and their victory conditions are different. One player takes the part of the three musketeers, the other of Cardinal Richelieu's men ("the enemy"). The musketeer player sets up their tokens in two opposite corners and in the center space; the enemy places tokens in all remaining board spaces. The players take turns moving one piece, beginning with the musketeer player. The musketeer player must move a musketeer to any orthogonally (non-diagonal) adjacent space occupied by an enemy piece, removing that enemy piece from the game. Next, the enemy must move one enemy piece to any orthogonally adjacent empty space. The enemy wins if it forces all three musketeers to the same row or column. The musketeers win if on their turn they cannot move due to a lack of adjacent enemy pieces.

=== Those Protean Pieces of Pasteboard ===
All of the games in this section use a standard pack of cards.

- All My Diamonds, an auctioning game by Sid Sackson
- Bowling Solitaire, a one-player game by Sid Sackson that simulates ten-pin bowling.
- Card Baseball, by Sid Sackson
- Color Gin, a two-handed modification of Hollywood Gin by Sid Sackson
- Osmosis, by Sid Sackson
- Patterns, by Sid Sackson
- Poke, a two-player multi-genre card game that combines strong elements of Poker with trick-taking games
- Slam, a two-handed takeoff of Bridge by Sid Sackson
- Suit Yourself, by Sid Sackson

=== New Battles on an Old Battlefield ===
All of the games in this section use a checkerboard.

- Focus, by Sid Sackson; this game was later sold commercially
- Network, by Sid Sackson
- Take It Away, by Sid Sackson

=== Grab a Pencil ===
All of the games in this section are meant to be played with pencil and paper.

- Cutting Corners, by Sid Sackson; another attempt at a "boredom" game
- Hold That Line, by Sid Sackson; an attempt to move "boredom" games away from Tic-Tac-Toe
- Last Word, a paper-based Scrabble-esque game by Sid Sackson
- Paper Boxing, by Sid Sackson
- Patterns II, an inductive-reasoning game by Sid Sackson; see Eleusis for another game in this small genre
- Property, later republished as New York, by Sid Sackson

=== A Miscellany of Games ===
- Change Change, a simple solitaire utilizing coins by Sid Sackson
- Domino Bead Game, by Sid Sackson
- Haggle, a deliciously confusing party game by Sid Sackson
- Solitaire Dice, by Sid Sackson; published commercially under the names Choice, Einstein, and Can't Stop Express
- The No Game, a classic and simple party game

A second edition of the book was published in 1982; Dover Publications released an unabridged reprint, with an additional preface by Sackson, in 1992.

== Reviews ==
- Games #36
- Games and Puzzles
- Family Games: The 100 Best
