= Epaminondas (game) =

Abstract strategy board game

- Epaminondas starting position. Row A is Black's goal; row Z is White's.
- Designers: Robert Abbott
- Years active: 1975 to present
- Genres: Board game Abstract strategy game
- Players: 2
- Setup time: ~1 minute
- Chance: None
- Skills: Strategy, tactics
- Synonyms: Crossings

Epaminondas is a strategy board game invented by Robert Abbott in 1975. The game is named after the Theban general Epaminondas, known for the use of phalanx strategy in combat. The concept of the phalanx is integral to the game.

Epaminondas was originally introduced in Sid Sackson's A Gamut of Games as Crossings. While the original version used an 8×8 checkerboard, the current game uses a 12×14 board and different rules for capture. When published, it claimed to be one of the first modern games to acknowledge the name of its inventor in its rules.

== Phalanx ==
In the game, a phalanx is a horizontal, vertical, or diagonal line of two or more stones of the same color, with no empty spaces or enemy stones between them. A stone may belong to more than one phalanx, depending on the direction considered.

== Rules ==
=== Moves ===
White moves first; then turns alternate.

- A player can move a single piece one space in any direction (the same as a king in chess).
- A player can, instead, move a phalanx any number of spaces equal to or less than the number of pieces in the phalanx. All the pieces in the phalanx must all move in the same direction, and that direction must be along the line of the phalanx. (For example, a phalanx of three stones along a diagonal can move three, two, or one spaces along that diagonal.)
  - A player does not have to move an entire phalanx; the player can split the phalanx into two parts as long as the subset moved is continuous and moves no further than its length.
  - A phalanx cannot move through or across pieces of the same color.
- To keep the game from ending in a draw due to copycat moves, there is an additional rule: no player may move a piece onto their opponent's home row if that move creates a pattern of left-to-right symmetry on the board.

=== Captures ===
Only phalanxes can make captures. Capturing is never compulsory. The head piece of a phalanx may land on an enemy stone if the number of the following opponent's stones, in the direction of the phalanx movement and including the stone directly hit, is strictly smaller than the number of stones in the moving phalanx. In that case, those opponent's stones are captured. This means, a phalanx of length n may capture up to n-1 stones.

=== Winning ===
A player wins when, at the start of their turn, they have strictly more pieces on their opponent's home row than the opponent has on the player's home row. (To clarify, if at the beginning of Black's turn, Black has more pieces on row A than White has on row Z, Black wins. If at the beginning of White's turn, White has more pieces on row Z than Black has on row A, White wins.) This allows an opponent the chance to capture some of the offending stones on the turn after an incursion, or to counterattack on the opposite side of the board.

== Reception ==
Games magazine included Epaminondas in their "Top 100 Games of 1980", noting that "It comes in a beautiful edition that makes watching the shifting board position all the more enjoyable."

== Reviews ==
- Games #4
- Games & Puzzles
