= Lech Pijanowski =

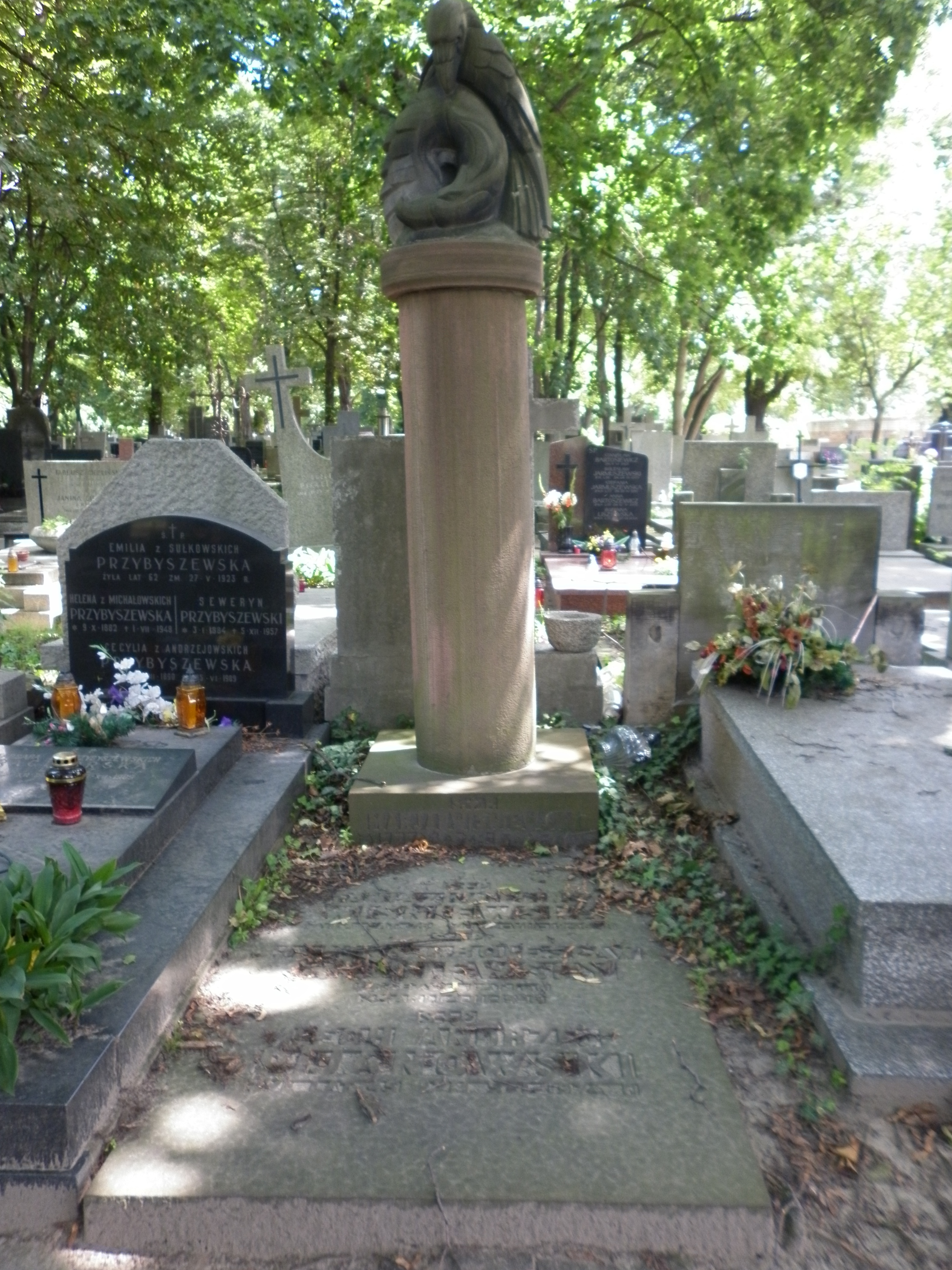
Lech Pijanowski's grave

Lech Andrzej Pijanowski ([ˈlɛx ˈandʐɛj pijaˈnɔfski]; 26 July 1928 – 6 January 1974) was a Polish film critic, broadcaster, director, screenwriter and populiser of games.

== Personal life ==
Pijanowski was born on 26 July 1928 in Warsaw and died 6 January 1974 aged 45 in Warsaw. He is buried in Powazki Cemetery.

== Games ==
Pijanowski contributed the game Lap, a development of Battleship, to A Gamut of Games, edited by Sid Sackson. In that game each player secretly divides an 8×8 grid of cells into four sectors of exactly 16 contiguous squares. Each player in turn gathers clues by asking their opponent how many cells in a particular 2×2 square belong to each sector. The first player who correctly deduces the opponent's setup wins the game.

== Films ==
Directed:

- 1950 Dzisiejsza gazeta
- 1955 Dyspozycja mocy
- 1955 Od Wrocławia

Screenplays:

- 1961 Droga na zachód (Road to the West)
- 1964 Barbara i Jan (TV series)
- 1971 Kłopotliwy gość (troublesome visitor)
