= Cups (game) =

1965 board game

- Ranks: Two
- Sowing: Single lap
- Region: United States

Cups is a contemporary American two-ranked single-lap member of the ancient game family of Mancala.

It was one of several games invented in 1965 by father and son Arthur Amberstone and Wald Amberstone who were both co-founders of the New York Gamers Association (N.Y.G.A.). They also invented Power, and High Deck, a card game based on medieval society. At the time, both were working as basket makers as well as game designers in New York City. This game was first published in A Gamut of Games by Sid Sackson in 1969. Wald Amberstone co-founded the Tarot School in 1995 along with his wife Ruth Amberstone.

== Rules ==
=== Equipment ===
The Cups board is constructed from ten containers: eight small containers called cups and two large containers called pots. In addition to these, 80 beans are needed. Traditionally, the game is played with odds and ends, jars, drinking cups and assorted items serving as the beans.

=== Setup ===
Each player has four cups in front of them and a pot at the end of every row on the furthest right. Each of the player's four cups is aligned adjacent to one of the other player's four cups. Each player receives forty beans as his stock and sits across from the other player.

=== Gameplay ===
==== Example Start of Game ====
1	1	1	1

Lower player begins by sowing four beans from his stock left to right.

1		1	1	1
	1		1	1

Higher player sows three beans from his stock right to left and captures a bean.

1		1	1	1
	1		1		1

Lower player sows the bean closest to his pot into his pot.

Players only play on their own four cups. At the beginning of a player's turn, the player has the option of doing one of two things.

- The player may remove 1, 2, 3, or 4 beans from his stock and sow them from his leftmost cup (furthest from his pot) towards his pot. Sowing, a term used in Mancala, means to place them in one by one along the line of cups.
- The player may empty one of his cups and sow the contents towards his pot. The player may only do this if the number of beans in the cup is exactly enough to reach the pot.

=== Capturing ===
If the player chooses option one and the last bean lands in an empty cup, a capture may take place. In a capture, the opponent's cup adjacent to the formerly empty cup is emptied and placed into the capturing player's pot, unless the opponents cup is empty.

=== Blocked cups ===
A blocked cup is one that contains more beans than would be needed to perform option two, sowing the beans into the pot. It is unwise to block one's cups because it makes sowing from that cup impossible.

=== Object ===
The object of Cups is to have more beans in one's pot than one's opponent. The game ends when neither player can make a move: a turn is always made if one is possible.

=== Variation ===
This game can also be played with any even number of cups. The cups are arranged in the same manner as above where each cup has one of the opponent's cup adjacent to it and a pot on each end. Ten beans are added to the player's stock for each extra cup he has. For example, if a player has ten cups, he would have 100 beans and the board would consist of 22 containers.
