= Bowling ball (disambiguation) =

A bowling ball is a hard spherical object used in the sport of bowling.

Bowling ball may also refer to:

- Bowling ball, a card in the game of Bowling (solitaire)
- "Bowling Balls", a song by Insane Clown Posse from the 2004 album Hell's Pit, and an associated short film

== See also ==
- Bowling Ball Beach, a beach in Mendocino County, California.
- "Human bowling ball", nickname of American Footballer Charlie Tolar
- "MTV Rock N' Jock Bowling Ball", a 1999 episode on the MTV television series MTV Rock N' Jock
