= Cassidy (given name) =

- Pronunciation: /ˈkæsɪdi/, /ˈkæsədi/ (KAS-uh-dee)
- Gender: Unisex

Origin
- Origin: Irish
- Meaning: "curly-haired"
- Region of origin: Ireland

Other names
- Related names: Kassidi, Kassidy, Cassadee, Kennedy

Cassidy is a gender-neutral given name derived from the Irish surname Ó Caiside and ultimately from the Gaelic given name Caiside, meaning "curly-haired." The name Caiside comes from the Irish word element cas, meaning "twisted, curly".

In the US, Cassidy first appeared among the 1,000 most popular names for American girls in 1981. It was most popular for girls in 1999, when it was the 99th most popular name for American girls. Usage rose in Canada and the UK around this time as well. Kassidy, an alternate spelling, peaked as the 314th most popular name for girls in 2000.

Cassidy first charted for boys in the US in 1983 and peaked as the 665th most popular boy name in 1984.

== People with the name ==
=== Cassidy ===
- Cassidy Benintente (born 1994), American soccer player
- Cassidy Cox (born 1998), American archer
- Cassidy Davis (born 1994), Australian footballer
- Cassidy Doneff (born 1986), American football player
- Cassidy Freeman (born 1982), American actress
- Cassidy Gifford (born 1993), American actress
- Cassidy Haley (born 1980), American singer-songwriter
- Cassidy Hutchinson (born 1996), American former Trump White House aide
- Cassidy Hubbarth (born 1984), American television host
- Cassidy Janson (born 1980), British actress
- Cassidy Krug (born 1985), American athlete
- Cassidy Lehrman (born 1992), American actress
- Cassidy Lichtman (born 1989), American volleyball player
- Cassidy O'Reilly (born 1976), American professional wrestler
- Cassidy Rae (born 1976), American actress
- Cassidy Sugimoto, American information scientist
- Cassidy Possum Tjapaltjarri (1923–2006), Australian visual artist
- Cassidy Turbin, American recording engineer
- Cassidy Wolf (born 1994), American model

== Fictional characters ==
- Cassidy, from the videogame Life Is Strange 2
- Rose of Sharon Cassidy, shortened to “Cass” in game, is a possible companion in the video game Fallout New Vegas
- Cassidy, a Team Rocket agent and partner of Butch in the English-language version of Pokémon animated series
- Cassidy, one presumed identity of Golden Freddy in Five Nights at Freddy's
- Cassidy Blake, eponymous main character of Victoria Schwab's book series
- Cassidy Bridges, from the American TV show Nash Bridges
- Cassidy "Beaver" Casablancas, from American TV show Veronica Mars
- Cassidy Chacon, from Italian comic book W.I.T.C.H.
- Cassidy Sharp, from American TV show This Is Us
- Cassidy Williams (Angel Dynamite), from American animated TV show Scooby-Doo! Mystery Incorporated

== See also ==
- Cassady (name), given name and surname
- Cassidy (surname)
