= Jim Cassidy =

Jim Cassidy may refer to:

- Jim Cassidy (actor), American pornographic actor and model
- Jim Cassidy (coach), former Australian rules football coach
- Jim Cassidy (footballer) (1869–?), Scottish football player
- Jim Cassidy (jockey) (born 1963), New Zealand jockey

== See also ==
- James Cassidy (disambiguation)
