= Crossings (game) =

Abstract strategy board game

Crossings is a two-player abstract strategy board game invented by Robert Abbott. The rules were published in Sid Sackson's A Gamut of Games. Crossings was the precursor to Epaminondas, which uses a larger board and expanded rules.

== Gameplay ==
=== Equipment ===
- 1 8x8 gameboard
- 32 stones (16 of each color)

=== Setup ===
	a	b	c	d	e	f	g	h
8	a8	b8	c8	d8	e8	f8	g8	h8	8
7	a7	b7	c7	d7	e7	f7	g7	h7	7
6	a6	b6	c6	d6	e6	f6	g6	h6	6
5	a5	b5	c5	d5	e5	f5	g5	h5	5
4	a4	b4	c4	d4	e4	f4	g4	h4	4
3	a3	b3	c3	d3	e3	f3	g3	h3	3
2	a2	b2	c2	d2	e2	f2	g2	h2	2
1	a1	b1	c1	d1	e1	f1	g1	h1	1
	a	b	c	d	e	f	g	h

This is the starting position of Crossings.

=== Object ===
- Cross one stone to the opponent's end of the gameboard.

=== Turns ===
- Play alternates with each player making one movement on a turn.
- Red takes the first turn.

=== Movement ===
A group is a series of one or more same-colored stones adjacent to one another in a line (diagonal, horizontal, or vertical). A stone may belong to one or more groups.

- A player may move a single stone, an entire group, or a subgroup.
- A group consisting of a single stone may move one space diagonally or orthogonally into an empty square.
- A group must move along the line which defines it. It may move a number of spaces equal to the number of pieces in that group.
- When part of a group is moved (a subgroup), it must move along the line which defines it. It may move a number of spaces equal to the number of pieces in the subgroup.
- When a subgroup is moved it must involve one of the end stones.
- Pieces may not move onto an occupied square.

=== Capturing an enemy stone ===
- If the first stone in a moving group encounters a single enemy stone, the group's movement stops there, and the enemy stone is captured.
- If the first stone in a moving group encounters an end stone of an opponent's group, it can capture that stone if the opponent's group is smaller.
- If it cannot capture the end stone because the opponent's group is the same size or larger, it is not allowed to move on to that square.

=== End of the game ===
- A player possibly wins the game if they get a stone on the home row, or row furthest from their side. If the opponent cannot get a stone of their own onto the first player's home row in the next move, the first player wins. Otherwise, those stones are "locked"; they cannot be moved or captured. The next attempt at crossing, as this is called, will determine the winner (unless it, too, is immediately followed by a counter-crossing, and so on.)
- The game is a draw if no player can complete the objective. Draws are rare.
