= Cassady =

Cassady may refer to:

- Cassady (grape)
- Cassady (name), given name and surname
- Cassady, Queensland, Australia, town now known as Taylor's Beach

== See also ==
- Cassidy (disambiguation)
