= Patrick Cassidy =

Patrick Cassidy may refer to:

- Patrick Cassidy (actor) (born 1962), American actor in musical theatre and television
- Patrick Cassidy (composer) (born 1956), Irish composer of film soundtracks
- Patrick Cassidy (footballer) (1887–?), English professional footballer
- Patrick Sarsfield Cassidy (c. 1850–1903), Irish American journalist, poet and revolutionary
- Patrick F. Cassidy (1915–1990), United States Army officer
