= Haggle =

Haggle may refer to

- Haggle (game), a party game
- Haggle (architecture) an autonomic networking architecture
- Bargaining, English word meaning to haggle or to bargain

== See also ==
- Bargaining (disambiguation)
- Dicker (disambiguation)
