= John Cassidy =

John Cassidy may refer to:

== Arts and entertainment ==
- John Cassidy (artist) (1860–1939), Irish sculptor and painter
- Jack Cassidy (John Joseph Edward Cassidy, 1927–1976), American actor
- John Cassidy (magician) (born 1967), American magician and balloon artist
- John Cassidy (children's writer), American children's writer

== Law and politics ==
- John Edward Cassidy (1896–1984), American lawyer in Illinois
- John P. Cassidy (1912–?), American politician in Los Angeles
- John E. Cassidy Jr. (1924–2003), American politician in Illinois

== Sports ==
- John Cassidy (baseball) (1855–1891), American baseball player
- John Cassidy (basketball) (born 1947), Canadian basketball player
- John Cassidy (speed skater) (born 1952), Canadian speed skater
- John Joe Cassidy (died 1995), Gaelic football player for Cavan

== Others ==
- John Cassidy (seismologist) (born 1959), Canadian seismologist
- John Cassidy (journalist) (born 1963), British-American business journalist
- John Cassidy (chancellor), Australian university chancellor
- John F. Cassidy, American businessman

== See also ==
- John Cassaday (1971–2024), American comic book artist
- John H. Cassady (1896–1969), American naval officer
