= Career Poker =

Dedicated-deck simulation card game

Original German edition published by Hexagames, 1988

Career Poker is a card game originally published in Germany as Karriere Poker in 1988 by Hexagames.

== Description ==
Career Poker is a hierarchical card shedding game for 4–8 players in which players try to become the company boss and avoid becoming the dishwasher. The game uses a deck with 8 suits of 13 cards each and four wild cards. The wild cards can be used as any rank; if played without any normal cards, the wild card counts as the highest card in the deck.

=== Gameplay ===
The deck is shuffled, and 13 cards are dealt to each player. The first player leads any single card or set of cards that are identical (two 7s, three 10s, etc.), and can use one or more wild cards to complete a set. The next player to the left may either pass or raise. In order to raise, the player must lay down the same number of matching cards as the first player laid down, but they must be higher in rank. The next player has the same option of pass or raise, but this time, the cards must be higher than the second player's. Play continues until all players pass. The cards on the table are discarded, and the player who successfully played the highest card or set of cards leads to start the next round.

Example: In a five-player game, the first player lays down three 7s. The second player does not have three matching cards and passes. The third player raises with two 9s and a wild card. The fourth player has three 8s, but these are lower than three 9s, and is forced to pass. The fifth player raises with a 10 and two wild cards. No one has three cards higher than this, ending the round. The lead for the next round passes to the fifth player, who played the highest cards in the first round.

=== Careers ===
The first person who gets rid of all their cards becomes the Boss. The second player becomes the Business Executive, the third becomes the Manager, and so on. The last player holding cards in their hand becomes the Dishwasher. Seating is rearranged so that the players are seated in clockwise order according to their company ranking from the Boss down to the Dishwasher. The Dishwasher (seated to the left of the President), shuffles and deals the cards again. Before play begins, the lowest ranked players must give the highest ranked players their best cards, and in return, they receive the highest ranked players' worst cards. How many players are playing determines who swaps cards with whom, and how many cards are swapped.

Play now continues for another hand. At the end of the hand, seating order is rearranged again.

The game can continue indefinitely or until a predetermined condition is reached such as a time limit, a set number of hands, or the same player becomes Boss for a certain number of consecutive hands.

== Publication history ==
Hexagames published Karriere Poker in Germany in 1988, and it has been republished under a variety of names and languages:

- Career Poker (English, Salagames, 1988)
- Hollywood Poker (Multilingual, Fun Connection, 1993)
- Animal Poker (German and English editions, HeidelBÄR Games, 2022)

== Reception ==
Brian Walker reviewed Karriere Poker for Games International magazine, and gave it a very good rating of 4 stars out of 5, stating "Of course you can play the game for fun, and of that there is plenty, provided you're not doing the washing up."

Writing for WIN Spiele, Dagmar de Cassan reviewed a new edition titled Hollywood Poker and noted, "The new edition of Karriere Poker has changed a bit thematically and graphically, but the fun of the game is the same [...] From dishwasher to millionaire and back to dishwasher is a typical career path."
