= Logic maze =

Logic puzzle related to a typical maze

Logic mazes, sometimes called mazes with rules or multi-state mazes, are logic puzzles with all the aspects of a tour puzzle that fall outside of the scope of a typical maze. These mazes have special rules, sometimes including multiple states of the maze or navigator. A ruleset can be basic (such as "you cannot make left turns") or complex. Popular logic mazes include tilt mazes and other novel designs which usually increase the complexity of the maze, sometimes to the point that the maze has to be designed by a program to eliminate multiple paths.

== History ==
Robert Abbott invented the logic maze.

The first logic maze ever published, Traffic Maze in Floyd's Knob, appeared in the October 1962 issue of Scientific American in the Mathematical Games column.

== Examples ==
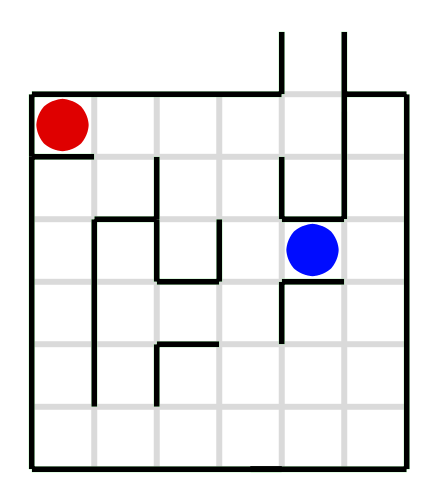
A Theseus and the Minotaur maze, showing Theseus (blue) and the Minotaur (red)

Theseus and the Minotaur is another of Abbott's better-known mazes. It first appeared in his book Mad Mazes. Like Where are the Cows? in SuperMazes, Abbott says that this "is the hardest maze in the book; in fact, it is possible that no one will solve it." Since then, several different versions of it have appeared, made by others, following the same theme, both on paper and in electronic forms.

Additional examples include:

- Area-mazes or A-mazes, which the area of the tile stepped on must alternately increase and decrease with every step.
- Rolling dice mazes, in which a die is rolled onto cells based on various rules.
- Number mazes, in which a grid of numbers is navigated by traveling the number shown on the current square.
- Multi-State mazes, in which the rules for navigation change depending on how the maze has been navigated.
