= I'm the Boss! =

Negotiation board game

- Designers: Sid Sackson
- Players: 3-6
- Playing time: 60 minutes +
- Age range: 12+
- Skills: Negotiation, Counting

I'm the Boss! is a board game by American designer Sid Sackson. It is a negotiation game in which a group of players compete and cooperate to put together profitable business deals. The goal is to make the most money. I'm the Boss is currently published by Gryphon Games, after the Face2Face Games edition. It was previously published as Kohle, Kies & Knete.

== Components ==
- A game board with a circular track of sixteen spaces, each depicting share volume and investors of a potential deal.
- Fifteen tiles showing the share prices of deals, numbered 1 to 15 ("Deal" cards).
- A supply of light card stock play money.
- One dollar sign shaped marker.
- One die.
- Six cards representing investors.
- A custom deck of 98 cards ("Influence" cards).

== Rules ==
The money is sorted into denominations. Each player is randomly issued investor cards (usually one), with remainders placed face up near the board. The player with the first investor alphabetically will play first; the player to his right chooses which board space to place the dollar marker upon. The deck is shuffled and each player is dealt five cards. The tiles are sorted in order and placed on the board.

Players act in turn. On each game turn, the acting player may either leave the marker in place or roll the die and advance the marker. If he does the latter, he may either play the new space or draw three cards from the deck.

If a player does not draw cards, he may attempt to make a deal based on the current board position. Notations on the board dictate which investors must be involved to close the deal, as well as the number of shares that will pay out. The tile indicates the share price. Most spaces offer choices as to which investors to involve, while some do not.

In order for a deal to occur, players who control the required investors must agree to the terms proposed by the acting player. Terms may only specify which investors will be involved and how the total proceeds of the deal will be distributed: no other offer of consideration is legal play. Players need not control an investor involved in the deal in order to be included in its terms. In particular, the acting player may propose a deal where he draws proceeds merely for the service of allowing the deal to go through.

If an agreement is reached, the proceeds (share price × number of shares) are distributed as agreed. The current tile is placed over the current board space, indicating that the deal was done. Such spaces are skipped in future board movement. If the acting player cannot bring negotiations to a satisfactory conclusion, he may end his turn. No proceeds are generated and the current tile and board space remain as before.

At any time during negotiations, cards may be played. These can have a variety of effects under different circumstances, including:

- Bringing a temporary proxy for one of the investors (a "Clan card") into play for the duration of the deal.
- Rendering an investor (or proxy) ineligible for the current deal.
- Taking ownership of an investor from another player, or from the face-up pool.
- Taking over the role of the current player ("The Boss"), both in approving the terms of the deal and in subsequent passing of the turn order.
- Cancelling the effect of another card play.

The game ends after the conclusion of one of the last few deals on the tile stack. From the tenth tile onward, there is an increasing probability (marked on the reverse of the tile) for a die roll to immediately end the game. The game ends automatically after the fifteenth tile, if it is reached.

The player with the most money is the winner.
