= Crude: The Oil Game =

Box cover of original 1976 edition

Crude: The Oil Game, also marketed as McMulti, is a board game originally published by St. Laurent Games in 1974 that emulates the international oil market.

== Contents ==
Crude: The Oil Game is a game in which players buy and sell oil on the foreign and domestic markets, and then produce and refine crude oil which is then sold to the customer.

=== Components ===
The game box of the 2012 Stronghold Games edition contains:

- 2 game boards: Economy and Operations
- 8 News Cards
- 7 Economy Cards
- Money Tokens
- 2 Production Dice (1 red, 1 black)
- 1 Difference Die (green)
- approximately 300 plastic pieces (Drilling Rigs, Oil Wells, Oil Refineries, Gas Stations, Crude Oil Barrels, Gasoline Barrels
- Rulebook

=== Gameplay ===
Each player starts with a small company, and by drilling for oil, refining it into gasoline, and selling it to the consumer, tries to build a large multinational company.

=== Victory conditions ===
The first player to reach a corporate value of $750 million is the winner.

== Publication history ==
Crude: The Oil Game was originally designed by James J. St. Laurent, who founded St. Laurent Games to publish it. The game used paper and cardboard pieces, and did not sell well. After it went out of print, Hexagames published an unauthorized German edition in Europe called McMulti that replaced the cardboard counters with plastic pieces.

In 2010, Stronghold Games approached James St. Laurent to produce an updated version of Crude: The Oil Game. St. Laurent worked with Stronghold for a year, but died in 2011, a year before the revised edition was published in 2012. Pegasus Games also published a licensed German version in Europe using the title McMulti.

== Reception ==
In the inaugural issue of Games International, Brian Walker reviewed the reissue of the game and gave it an above average rating of 4 stars out of 5, stating "It's taken eleven years for it to reappear in the shelf, don't miss out on it this time around."

Dirk Trefzger, writing for Spielmonster, liked the game but found that games seemed long at three hours, and gameplay did not vary enough as the game progressed. He concluded that it was a "good economic game — but there is not enough variety during long games." He concluded by giving the game scores of 4 out of 6 for components, rules and playability, and 5 out of 6 for "Idea".

The website Das-SpielEn noted that the new 2014 edition was a "feature-rich" game best played with four people. The only disappointment was the money, which was provided by cardboard "coins" rather than paper bills.

WeltenSicht found that "One difficulty can be the eternal arithmetic." The reviewer also noted that playing time was significantly longer than advertised and advised players to reduce the amount needed to win in order to shorten the game.

Aaron Thomas, writing for Westpark Gamers, found that the game mechanics became rather stale as the game dragged on. Thomas gave the game only an average ranking.
