= Black Monday (card game) =

Black Monday is a card game published in 1988 by Hexagames.

== Contents ==
Black Monday is a game in which each players use cards to represent shares of stock and how they can fall or rise.

== Reception ==
Brian Walker reviewed Black Monday for Games International magazine, and gave it 3 stars out of 5, and stated that "The game is fun to play and quite skillful when played with three or four; any more and it's pretty random. Not one of Sid's best, though."

Paul Brady for The Guardian said "It is a simple card game, easy to pick up, but can be fast and furious when you have the knack."

Barry Ellis, writing in The Game Report, noted "Practically any game by Sid Sackson is a joy to play, as it invariably has simple rules yet ample opportunities abound for serious decision making and player interaction." Regarding Black Monday, Ellis admitted, "This is not one of his best efforts, but I'm currently finding it to be entertaining, and perhaps more importantly, I have no problem getting people to play it."
