= Cassaday =

Cassaday is a surname. Notable people with the surname include:

- Helen Cassaday, British neuroscientist
- John Cassaday (1971–2024), American comic book artist and writer
