= Hexagames =

Defunct board game company

- Industry: Board games
- Founded: 1982; 44 years ago
- Defunct: 1992
- Headquarters: Dreieich, Germany
- Key people: Langden Hensley; Jürgen Hagedorn; Joe Nikisch

Hexagames was a German game publisher in Dreieich, which existed from 1982 to 1992. It was one of the most famous German game publishers of the 1980s, notable for publishing games such as Lines of Action (1988) and Cosmic Encounter (1992).

== History ==
Hexagames was created by Langden Hensley, with the trademark being registered by the German Patent and Trademark Office in late 1982. In 1982, he and Jürgen Hagedorn released the game Long Short, developed by Hensley.

After the game publisher Bütehorn went bankrupt around 1982, Hexagames included several of their games in its program. Hagedorn retired from Hexagames in 1988. Joe Nikisch, the founder of the board game company Abacusspiele, was responsible for the product range of Hexagames as product manager beginning in 1986. After the dissolution of Hexagames in 1992, the Berlin games manufacturer Sala took over some of the games under the Salagames label. Salagames also disappeared from the market after about two years and in 1994 some Hexagames games were republished by Abacusspiele.

In 1994, Hensley lost the "Hexagames" trademark, which was re-registered by the publishers "BOB Marketing & Sales GmbH" in Langen. Some Hexagames games were later published by other publishers: Osiris (1995), and Karriere Poker (1996).

== Awards ==
Several Hexagames games received various awards or been nominated for Spiel des Jahres (Game of the Year):

- Spiel des Jahres
  - 1987: The 1st Million by Sid Sackson (nominated)
  - 1988: Lines of Action by Claude Soucie (nominated)
  - 1989: Uisge (1984) by Roland Siegers (special award for "Most Beautiful Game")
  - 1989: Abilene (1985) by Roland Siegers (nominated)
  - 1990: Dino by Reinhold Wittig (nominated)
- Deutscher Spiele Preis
  - 1990: Römer by Rudolf Ross (7th place)
  - 1992: Cosmic Encounter by Bill Eberle, Peter Olotka, Jack Kittredge, and Bill Norton (6th place)
- Á la Carte Card Game Prize
  - 1992: Res Publica by Reiner Knizia (1st place)
  - 1992: Musketeers by Franz Josef Lamminger (4th place)

== Other notable games ==
- Conquest by Donald Benge (1984)
- Black Monday (1988)
- Karrierepoker by Klaus Grähnke and Brian Walker (1988)
- McMulti by James J St Laurent (1988)
- Can't Stop Express by Sid Sackson (1989)
- Digging by Reiner Knizia (1990)
- Manager by Peter Pfeifer and Waltraud Pfeif (1991)
