= Bowling (solitaire) =

Bowling Solitaire is a patience or solitaire card game that uses a single deck of standard playing cards to simulate a round of ten-pin bowling.

Two completely different games of Bowling Solitaire were created independently of each other. One was published in the book A Gamut of Games by Sid Sackson in 1969. The other was featured in a computer game by Sierra Online in 1988.

== Sid Sackson's Bowling Solitaire (1969) ==
This solitaire game was designed by Sid Sackson, and published in his book A Gamut of Games (1969). Sackson wrote that he created the game because of his distaste for traditional solitaire games in which a red 9 is placed on a black 10. Besides being popular with modern hobby gamers, Bowling Solitaire has been published as a separate game, and has also been implemented with a digital port.

=== Rules ===
Setup: Bowling Solitaire uses the Ace through 10 from two suits. From a shuffled pile of these 20 cards, ten cards representing the "pins" are randomly placed face-up in the same pattern as the pins are arranged for a normal game of ten pin bowling. Three "bowling ball" piles of face-down cards (five, three, and two cards respectively) are also dealt.

Game-play: The top card of all bowling ball piles is turned face up, one of which is selected to "bowl" at the ten face-up pins. A single pin card can be removed if it matches the number on this ball card. Alternatively two or three pin cards that are adjacent can be removed if the final digit of their total value corresponds to the value of the bowling ball card used. Some restrictions apply (e.g. you can't use the very first ball card played to knock over any pins in the back row; pins knocked over must be adjacent).

The next card in the bowling ball pile used is turned face up, and another of the three face-up bowling ball cards is used in the same manner, until no further plays are possible.

Scoring: Removing all ten pins in this way counts as a strike, and concludes the frame. If a strike is not achieved, the top cards from all the ball piles are discarded, and play continues by turning over new cards on each of the piles. This action represents using a second bowling ball. Successfully removing all ten pins with these new cards also concludes the frame and counts as a spare. In the event all ten pins are not knocked over with this continued play, and if no further moves are possible, the frame is concluded with the number of pins removed representing the number of pins knocked over.

To begin a new frame, the 20 cards are shuffled and the process is repeated. A complete game consists of ten such frames. Scoring otherwise works exactly the same as it does in actual ten pin bowling.

=== Versions ===
Although Bowling Solitaire was created to be a solitaire game played with a standard deck of playing cards, its popularity led to a version with custom cards. This was published by Eagle-Gryphon Games in 2016, and was included along with their game Elevenses for One.

A digital port using Java was created by Timothy S. Adam.

== Sierra Online's Bowling Solitaire (1988) ==
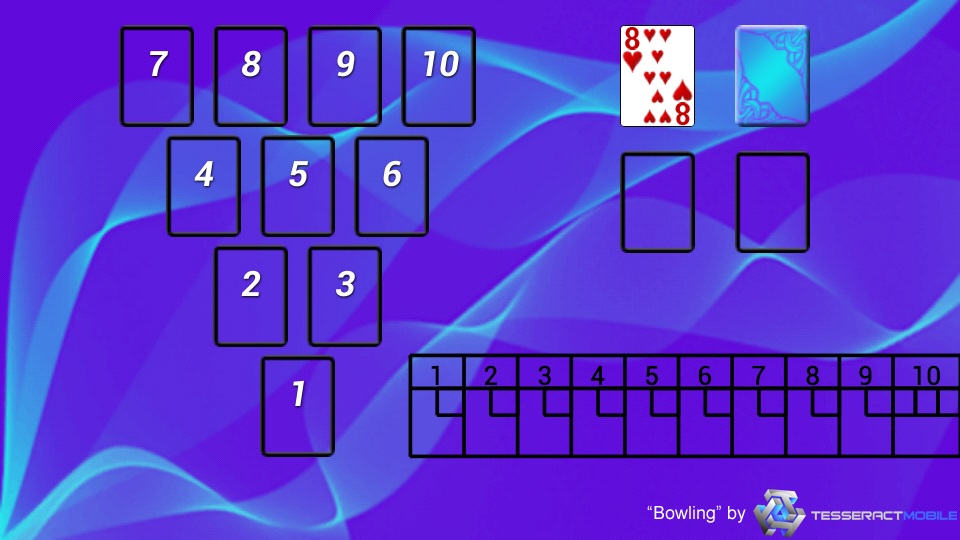
Screenshot of Bowling

This solitaire game was designed by Warren Schwader and featured in the 1988 computer game Hoyle: Official Book of Games Vol 2: Solitaire by Sierra Online. It has subsequently been implemented on several websites and programs that implement digital versions of solitaire games. The object of the game is to try to fill as many Pins as possible for each of the ten frames.

=== Rules ===
Setup: Bowling has ten "Pin Piles". Two "Ball Piles" located below the deck can contain up to three cards each. The scoring frame is located either above or below the gameplay.

Game-play: To begin playing, turn up one card at a time from the deck. The card turned up must be planted on one of the Pin Piles, or placed onto one of the Ball Piles. All the Pin Piles should be filled in order from lowest ranking cards (towards the bottom) to the highest ranking cards (towards the top right). There are only ten Pins, but there are thirteen ranks of cards. The difficult part of this game is anticipating what ranks will not be drawn from the Deck.

Here is an example of a possible arrangement:

9 _ Q K
 5 _ 7
  2 4
   A

Only a ten or a Jack can be placed onto the empty Pin between the nine and Queen. Only a six can fill the empty space between the five and seven. Place multiple cards of the same rank into the same piles. If a three or an eight is drawn, they must be put in the Ball Pile because it cannot be placed with the Pins.

Scoring: Bowling Solitaire is scored the same way regular ten-pin bowling is scored. To get a strike, fill all the Pins before placing a card in the Ball Pile. To receive a spare, fill all Pins before placing cards into the second Ball Pile. Otherwise, points are scored by the amount of spaces filled before both Ball Piles are filled. After both Ball Piles have been filled with three cards each, that round of the game will end. The game consists of ten rounds.

== See also ==
- List of solitaires
- Glossary of solitaire
