= Cassady (name) =

Cassady is a given name and surname. Notable people with the name include:

- Cassady McClincy (born 2000), American actress
- Carolyn Cassady (1923–2013), American writer
- Colin Cassady, ring name of American wrestler William Morrissey
- Harry Cassady, American baseball player
- Howard Cassady, American football player
- John H. Cassady, American admiral
- Neal Cassady, American writer
- Thomas Cassady, American soldier and flying ace
- Adam Cassady, American Ambassador-at-Large for Cyberspace and Digital Policy

== See also ==
- Cassaday, a surname
- Cassidy (given name)
- Cassidy (surname)
