= Haggle (architecture) =

Haggle is a European Union funded project in Situated and Autonomic Communications.

Haggle is an autonomic networking architecture designed to enable communication when network connectivity is intermittent. In particular, Haggle exploits opportunistic contacts between mobile users to deliver data to the destination.

== See also ==
- Delay-tolerant networking
- Haggle
