= Haggle (game) =

Party game involving trading of portions of rules

Haggle is a party game designed by Sid Sackson and intended for a large number of players. It is rather complex and involved compared to many party games and, as a result, is often played only at gatherings of people who are known to enjoy gaming at other times.

At the start of the game, each player receives a secret, random, collection of plain, colored cards plus one or more slips, each one explaining one of the many valuation rules. These rules are made up by the game organiser before the game is played, and are not told to the players. Instead, different players will have different sets of knowledge about the rules. (Typical rules might be "red cards are worth two points each" or "each yellow card doubles your final score".)

The objective is for each player to accumulate the highest scoring collection of cards that they can. The players are given a particular amount of time - anything from twenty minutes to the whole party - to mix with each other. Players may trade cards on any terms they choose. They may also trade information about the rules. Before the end of the game, each player is required to hand in their final card collection in an envelope. The referee, who knows all the rules, then scores each hand and the player with the highest score wins. Typically, the winner will get a small prize of some type.

The game very strongly encourages people to mix with each other, but is rather complex for some players. Care must also be taken to ensure that the starting hands are similar in value.

Haggle is one of the games presented in Sackson's book, A Gamut of Games.

== See also ==
- Haggle (disambiguation)
