= James Cassidy =

James, Jamie or Jim Cassidy may refer to:

- Jim Cassidy (footballer) (1869–?), Scottish football player
- James Edwin Cassidy (1869–1951), American Roman Catholic bishop in Massachusetts
- James H. Cassidy (1869–1926), United States Representative from Ohio
- Jim Cassidy (coach) (1878–1956), former Australian rules football coach
- James Cassidy (musician), American bass and keyboard player
- Jim Cassidy, stage name of Rick Cassidy (1943–2013), American pornographic actor and model
- Jim Cassidy (jockey) (born 1963), New Zealand jockey
- Jamie Cassidy (born 1977), English footballer
- Jimmy Cassidy (singer), English singer in the 1960s

== See also ==
- Jim Cassidy (disambiguation)
