= Römer (card game) =

Römer is a card game published in 1990 by Hexagames.

== Contents ==
Römer is a game in which players form a Roman chariot with six horses attached.

== Reception ==
Philip A Murphy reviewed Römer for Games International magazine, and gave it a rating of 5 out of 10, and stated that "Römer won't lie gathering dust in my cupboard: we'll play it now and again as a filler at the start of the evening while we're waiting for Alan ('Olympic Torch' – like the torch, he never goes out) to turn up, but a classic this is not."

Römer was nominated for the 1990 Deutscher Spiele Preis.
