= Bargaining (disambiguation) =

Bargaining is a type of negotiation.

Bargaining may also refer to:

- "Bargaining" (Buffy the Vampire Slayer), a 2001 television episode
- Collective bargaining, process of negotiating between employers and their employees, or employee representatives
- Plea bargain, an agreement in a criminal case
- Bargaining (psychology), one of the five stages of grief in the Kübler-Ross model

== See also ==
- Dickering (wapentake), a geographic subdivision in England
- Dicker (surname)
- Haggle (disambiguation)
