= Baroque chess =

Chess variant by Robert Abbott in 1962

Position: a8 black rook, b8 black knight, c8 black bishop, d8 black queen, e8 black king, f8 black bishop, g8 black knight, h8 black upside-down rook, a7 black pawn, b7 black pawn, c7 black pawn, d7 black pawn, e7 black pawn, f7 black pawn, g7 black pawn, h7 black pawn, a2 white pawn, b2 white pawn, c2 white pawn, d2 white pawn, e2 white pawn, f2 white pawn, g2 white pawn, h2 white pawn, a1 white upside-down rook, b1 white knight, c1 white bishop, d1 white king, e1 white queen, f1 white bishop, g1 white knight, h1 white rook

Possible starting setup for Baroque chess. Immobilizers are represented by inverted rooks.

Baroque chess is a chess variant invented in 1962 by Robert Abbott. In 1963, at the suggestion of his publisher, he changed the name to Ultima, by which name it is also known. Abbott later considered his invention flawed and suggested amendments to the rules, but these suggestions have been substantially ignored by the gaming community, which continues to play by the 1962 rules. Since the rules for Baroque were first laid down in 1962, some regional variation has arisen, causing the game to diverge from Ultima.

== Description ==
Baroque chess is usually played on a standard 8×8 chessboard with the standard Staunton design of chess pieces. The rules that follow are widely found on the internet, but other variants exist. One variant was popular among students at Cambridge University in 1974. The initial setup of the pieces is the same as in standard chess, except for two things that the players must first decide on – center counter symmetry, and corner counter symmetry.

=== Establishing the degree of symmetry ===
Center counter symmetry allows either player to decide whether to switch his king and Withdrawer ("queen") around, and then corner counter symmetry requires each player to decide which of his "rooks" will be turned upside down. (The one that remains upright is the Coordinator, and the one that is turned upside down is the Immobilizer.) After these two kinds of symmetries are determined, White moves first.

For purposes of recording the moves that are played in the game, it is sufficient to employ an algebraic form of notation, as in chess, and write the names of the pieces and the squares they are to be placed in. For instance, 1. Kd1 & We1, Ke8 & Wd8 (center counter symmetry), and 2. Ia1 & Ch1, Ih8 & Ca8 (corner counter symmetry).

If the symmetry resolution phases that are usually found at the start of the game could somehow be put off for later, then one may readily see how similar they are to the castling maneuvers in chess. They have the practical function of multiplying the number of games that are possible from the initial starting position.

=== Moving ===
In Baroque, the king is the only piece alone that is limited to moving exactly one square at a time; it moves and takes just like the king in chess. All of the remaining pieces on the first rank may move like the queen, in all directions. They have this power as a matter of privilege, as they are all considered to be noble pieces. This is a kind of privilege that attaches to them at the outset of the game, and is never diminished; they retain this privilege no matter where they go, except when they find themselves next to an Immobilizer (see below).

The pawns, on the other hand, move just like the rook moves in chess. Just as in chess, pawns are the peasants of this game. Unlike chess, pawns are never promoted to another kind of piece. (There is no special square to which pawns can be moved and then promoted.)

=== Capturing ===
All the pieces except for the king capture differently from their counterparts in chess, and all but the king and pawn have different names. The king is the only piece that captures, as chess pieces do, by moving into a square that is occupied by an enemy piece. All the other pieces capture enemy pieces in more complex ways. Friendly pieces are never allowed to capture other friendly pieces.

== Pieces ==
The names of the pieces and rules for movement are as follows:

- The king moves and captures like a standard chess king. There is no castling. The objective of the game is to capture the opposing king.
- The pawns (or pincers or squeezers) move like standard chess rooks. A pawn captures any opposing piece horizontally or vertically between the square to which the pawn moved and a friendly piece (i.e. there may be no gaps between any of the three pieces). This is considered a custodial form of capture because it is similar to two people coming up on the sides of a person and taking hold of their arms to carry them off. Pawns never capture diagonally, only horizontally or vertically.

The remaining pieces all move like standard chess queens, but have unique methods of capture.

- The Withdrawer (or Retreater), represented by the queen, captures by moving directly away from an adjacent piece.
- The Long-leapers, represented by the knights, capture by jumping over an opposing piece in a straight line. A long-leaper may make multiple captures in the same line as long as each piece is jumped independently. Those variants of Baroque prohibiting multiple leaps call this piece the Leaper, and restrict it to capturing the first enemy piece it encounters, provided the next space is empty or open.
- The Coordinator, represented by the unturned rook, captures any opposing piece that is on either of the two squares found at the intersection of its own file and the king's rank, and the intersection of the king's file and its own rank; these are found after the Coordinator has moved.
- The Immobilizer (or Freezer), represented by the inverted rook, does not capture anything, but immobilizes all adjacent enemy pieces. Some versions of Baroque allow an immobilized piece to commit suicide, i.e. be removed from the board, in lieu of the regular move of that player, for strategic reasons.
- The Imitators (or Chameleons), represented by the bishops, copy the capturing rules of its victims. Imitators also immobilize enemy Immobilizers adjacent to them. Imitators cannot capture other Imitators. An Imitator can capture an enemy king by beginning its turn adjacent to it, and stepping into its square.

== Variants ==
=== Maxima ===
Maxima was invented by Roberto Lavieri in 2003. It is Baroque played on a somewhat larger board that is mostly rectangular and 8×9 (a2–h10) but for a couple of extra squares that are outside the board, located at d1 and e1 just behind the king and queen's squares. A matching pair of squares are also on the other side of the board, just beyond the black king and queen (d11 and e11). Although one objective of the game is to checkmate the king, an alternative objective allows depositing pieces in both of the pair of squares on the other side of the board. Bare king is also a win. Unlike Baroque, the king in Maxima moves like the knight in chess, and moreover treats the board as a cylinder (e.g. Kb2–h3 is a legal move), making for a game with much more fluid movement of pieces.

There are two extra pieces: Mage and Guard. The Mage moves one square diagonally, then may continue its move orthogonally away from where it started (i.e. the move of the aanca from Grant Acedrex). It captures by displacement and is immune to the Immobiliser. The Guard moves and captures like the king in chess (not like the king in Maxima).

The order of White's pieces is:

- First rank: blank, Mage, blank, King, Withdrawer, blank, Mage, blank
- Second rank: Chameleon, Long-leaper, Coordinator, Immobiliser, Long-leaper, Chameleon
- Third rank: Guard, Pawn, Pawn, Pawn, Pawn, Pawn, Pawn, Guard

Black's setup is mirrored from White's, so the kings are on d2 and e10.

=== Optima ===
Baroque that is similar to Maxima with additional pieces and rules.

=== Renaissance ===
As shogi is to chess, Renaissance is to Baroque—pieces may be revived and reborn. It was invented by Matthew Monchalin in 1975. It is played on a 9×9 board; the arrangement of pieces on White's first rank is: Immobiliser, Long-leaper, Chameleon, Withdrawer, King, Bomb, Resurrector, Pusher, Coordinator. (The arrangement of the pieces on Black's first rank is backwards, so Immobilisers are on a1 and i9.) As in Ultima, White and Black may choose to swap Immobiliser and Coordinator. Captured pieces change sides and can be dropped back into play. The new pieces transform when captured: Pusher becomes Puller and vice versa, while Resurrector becomes Bomb and vice versa. Players may agree to have extra pieces in a queue, awaiting to enter the board. The pieces from Baroque are the same in Renaissance, except that in Renaissance the Long-leaper can only capture one man a turn.

The Resurrector (or Swapper or Ankh) moves like a queen for all ordinary purposes, but for swapping actions must move like a king, trading places with any adjacent piece (both friend or foe), never capturing it. Consistent with the concept of the Resurrector being a piece wholly incapable of killing, it can also step into any adjacent empty square, and leave behind a previously captured piece resurrected by placing it in the square just vacated. Although, seen in that light, though the Resurrector is like a piece of life, it can be transformed into a 1 square bomb when captured and readmitted to the board - but capable only of death. Instead of moving, a bomb need merely explode to effect the destruction of both friendly pieces and enemy pieces adjacent to itself, and suiciding in the process. The destruction of pieces in this way causes all affected to be unrevivable.

There are also two more pieces that, like the Coordinator, are not capable of unassisted capture: the Pusher and the Puller. They can move like queens for ordinary purposes, but for the purpose of exercising their special powers, they must be adjacent to the affected piece at the start of the turn. If they begin adjacent to a piece (regardless if friendly or foe), they can push or pull it by 1 square. For a Pusher, the empty square on the other side must be open (except for the unusual circumstance of driving a king into an enemy piece, or an Imitator into a king.) Although the Pushers and Pullers are not capable of capture, their pushing and pulling maneuvers can result in other pieces being forced to make captures, regardless of the captured one being a friendly or enemy piece. (If a Puller pulls an enemy Puller, then that enemy Puller also pulls a piece along with it.)

=== Rococo ===
Rococo was invented by Peter Aronson and David Howe in 2002. It is a species of Baroque that is played on a 10×10 board for the purposes of captures, but on the inner 8×8 square just inside it for the purpose of movement. To put it another way, the outer perimeter of squares can only be entered as a result of a capturing maneuver. In addition to the traditional Baroque pieces, Rococo has an Advancer piece that moves like a queen, but captures the enemy piece it has run up next to, stopping just short of the piece taken. As is usual for most pieces of the Baroque family, the Advancer will not enter into the space vacated by the captured piece, it merely runs up to it, and stops short by 1 square. Unlike the game of Renaissance described above, Rococo has a similarly named Swapper piece that moves like a queen, but trades places with the enemy it runs up to, a full queen's move away. The Rococo Swapper has the unusual property of self-destructing at will, in lieu of moving, provided it is not at the same time immobilized, with the effect of taking one enemy piece alongside it. What sets Rococo apart from Baroque the most is the way the pawns work; they are called cannonball pawns and move like a king, stepping 1 square in all directions, or leap over any adjacent piece (friend or foe). The only way that they can effect capture is by leaping, and landing on the enemy piece. They cannot capture like a king does. Cannonball pawns can be promoted into other pieces when they reach the other side of the board.

The pawn formations unique to the parent game, Baroque, already significantly different from traditional chess, are not seen in Rococo. Instead, Rococo's cannonball pawns seem to hang away from enemy pieces by two or three squares, rarely coming into contact with each other without advance preparation. In both chess and Baroque, however, fine nuances in maneuvering are made possible by locking positions together, made concrete by the establishment of well-defined pawn structures. This sort of thing is lacking in Rococo.

== See also ==
- Penultima
