= Abilene (board game) =

Wild West board game

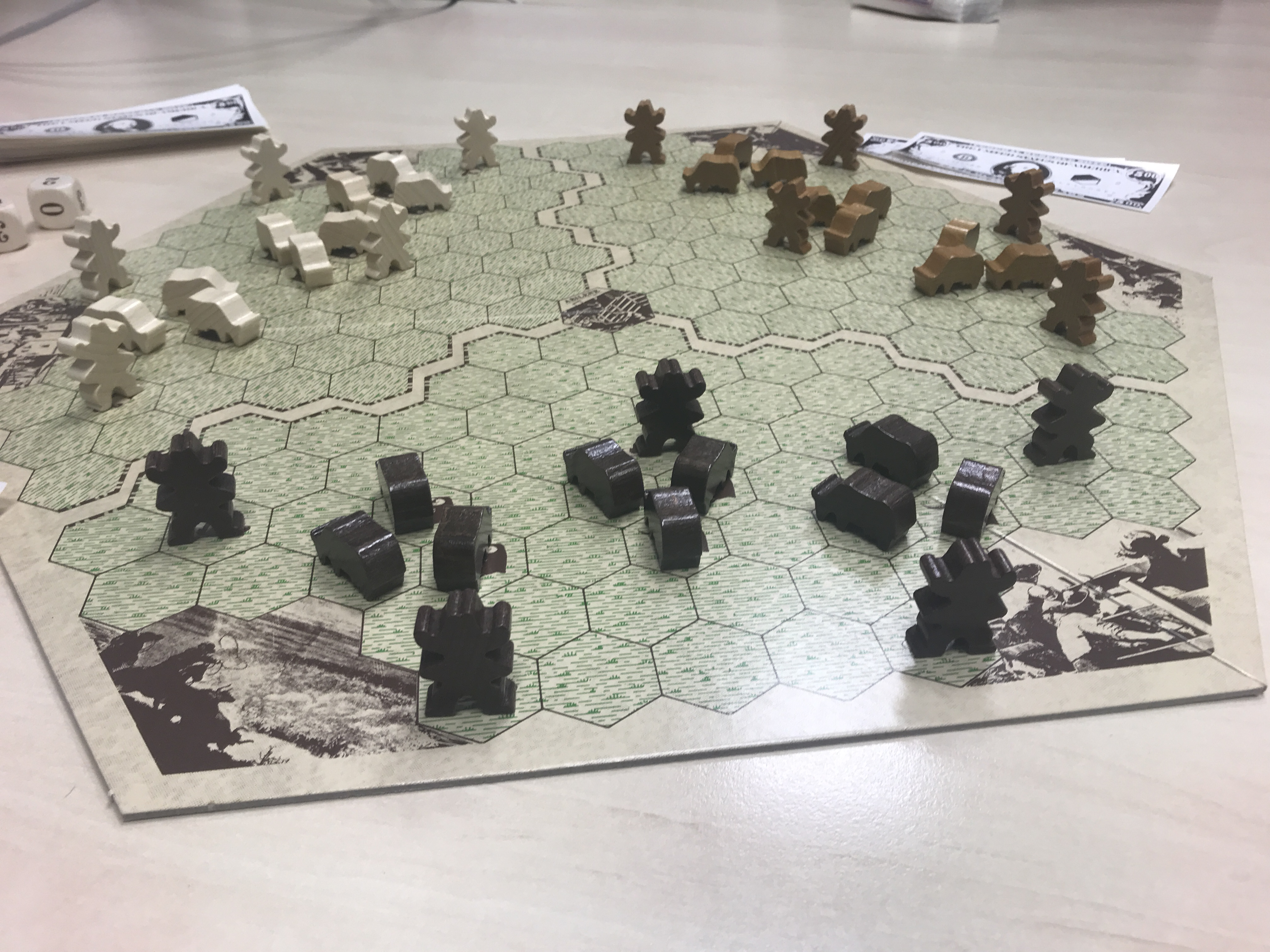
- Players move their herds to Abilene
- Designers: Roland Siegers
- Publishers: Hexagames; Schmidt Spiele
- Publication: 1984; 41 years ago
- Players: 3-6
- Playing time: 45 minutes
- Age range: 8+

Abilene is a western board game designed by Roland Siegers. It was published in 1984 by Hexagames and re-published in 1993 by Schmidt Spiele. It is set in the city of Abilene during 1870, which at the time was considered the main transshipment point for the herds of the Texan cattle barons. In the game, each player plays as a rancher who, with the help of their cowboys, drives their herds to Abilene, trying to capture parts of their opponents' herds along the way.

== Gameplay ==
In a three-player game, each player begins the game with nine herds—three diseased and marked with a notch on their bellies—and $2000 in banknotes. Players choose which starting spaces to place each cattle, not indicating where the diseased cattle are hidden from the other players. As the game progresses, each player tries to drive their herds across their pastures to the city of Abilene in the middle of the board.

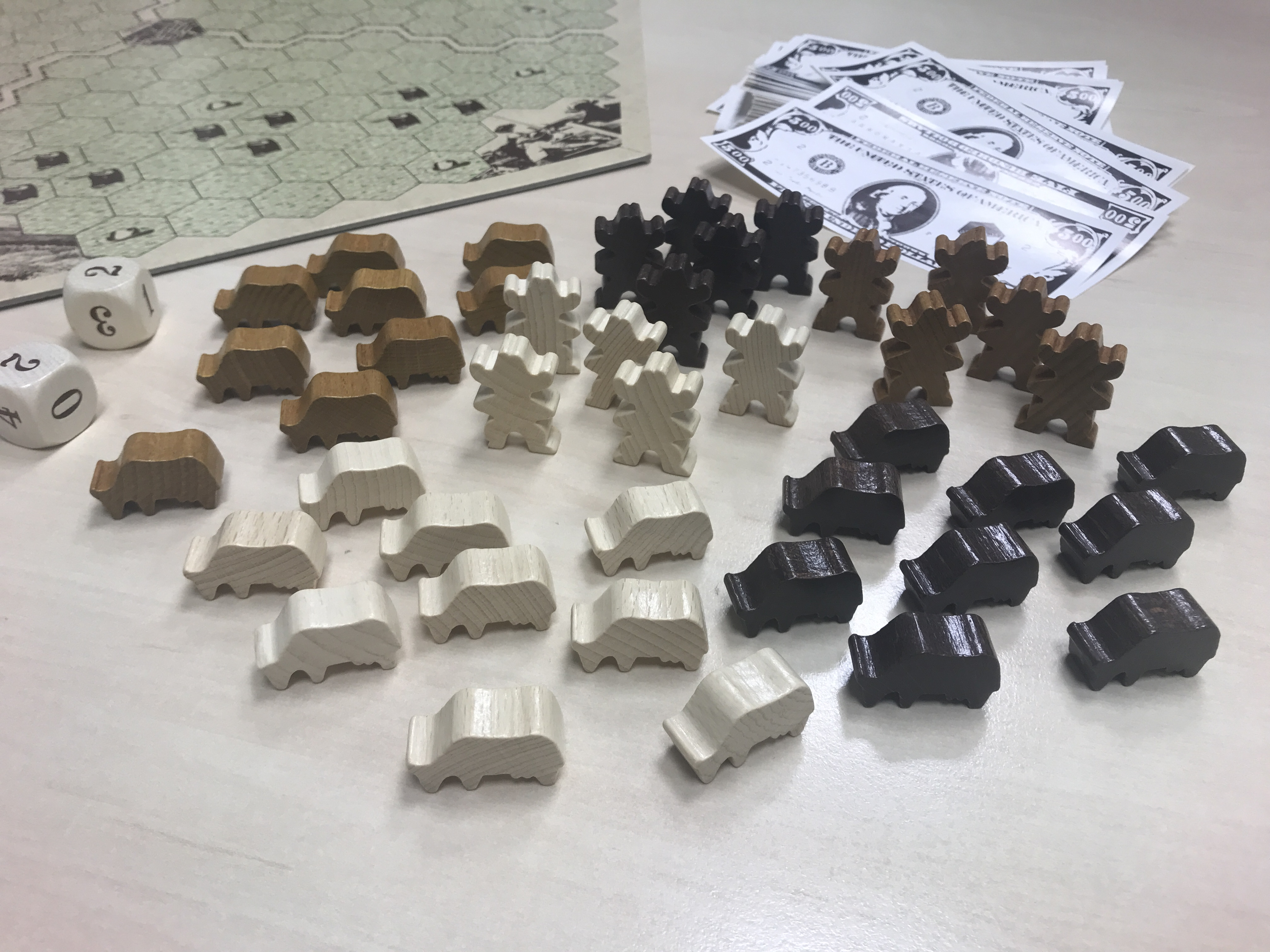
Abilene components

Each player has three movement points (MPs) on their turn, which they can divide between one, two, or three herds on their land. They then roll two dice and distribute the resulting MPs between up to two cowboys, who must move the full total of the roll and are only allowed to make one change of direction at a time. Cowboys can enter their neighbors' fields to capture enemy herds by moving on to the space of an opposing player's herd. The capturing player can then check the herd for disease and place it in an empty starting space in the capturing player's territory. If a cowboy moves onto a field with an opposing cowboy, a dice duel occurs, and the player with the higher roll wins. If a cowboy loses a duel on an opponent's pasture, they are shot and removed from the field; if they lose on their pasture, they flee to one of their empty starting spaces. If a player has one cowboy left in play, they may once choose to bring a cowboy back into play and place them on an empty starting space. The cowboys may never enter the Abilene square.

When a herd arrives in Abilene, its owner declares it healthy, and the other players decide whether they believe or disbelieve this. The herd is turned over, and the state of health is checked. The seller of the herd receives $1,000 from the bank for their herd and $2,000 for a captured foreign herd. After that, they get $500 or $1000 from each player who has misjudged the state of health and must pay the same sum to players who correctly guessed the health. If a player runs out of money, they can borrow money from the bank or another player. If they borrow money from the bank, they must pay it back at the end of the game, along with $500 in interest for every $2000 borrowed. If they borrow money from another player, the terms can be negotiated.

The game ends when 21 herds arrive in Abilene, and the winner is the player with the most money.

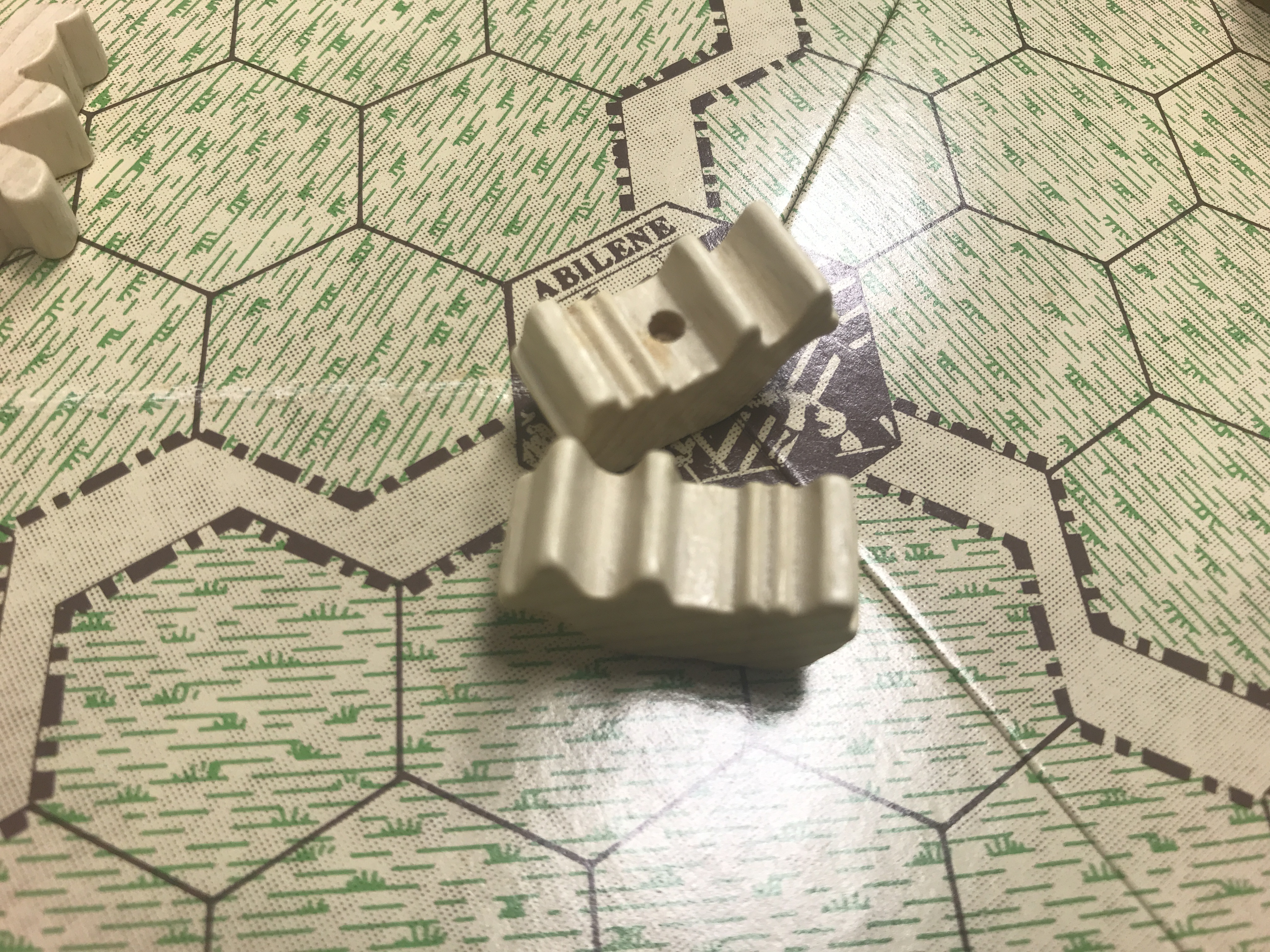
A diseased herd (above) and a healthy herd (below)

== Reception ==
In 1984, Abilene was one of four finals of the German Board Game Team Championship. The game was on the recommended list for the 1985 Spiel des Jahres.
