= John Cassidy (children's writer) =

American writer

John Cassidy is the chief executive and co-founder of Klutz Press and author of over 200 instructional and children's books, including Juggling for the Complete Klutz, The Klutz Book of Inventions, and The Klutz Book of Brilliantly Ridiculous Inventions.

Cassidy attended Stanford University, where he studied English and Education. While at Stanford he also became a friend of Darrell Lorentzen and B.C. Rimbeaux, with whom he would eventually found Klutz Press.

In 1977, while working as a student teacher at a high school in Mountain View, California, Cassidy began his career as a juggling pedagogue by handing out 75 tennis balls to his sophomore remedial-reading class, along with instructions on juggling. Pleased with his students' response, Cassidy, along with his college friends Lorentzen and Rimbeaux, wrote and published Juggling for the Complete Klutz. The book did well, selling 50,000 copies by the end of 1978. That same year Cassidy, Lorentzen, and Rimbeaux co-founded Klutz Press in Palo Alto, California.

Cassidy has remained the chief executive and "creative force" of the company since its founding. In that time he has written over 200 books for Klutz. Juggling for the Complete Klutz, the company's most popular title, has sold over 2.5 million copies.

In May, 2006, the Children's Discovery Museum of San Jose awarded Cassidy the seventh annual Legacy for Children Award, which honors "an individual or organization whose work has significantly benefited the learning and lives of children." Previous awardees included Dr. Seuss, Bil Keane, and Fred Rogers.

In 2018, Cassidy became a board member of the nonprofit rafting company, ARTA River Trips.
