= HMAS Sleuth =

Two ships of the Royal Australian Navy have been named HMAS Sleuth.

- HMAS Sleuth (1917), a yacht commissioned on 13 January 1917 as a patrol vessel, decommissioned in 1920. Recommissioned in 1990 during Sydney's Navy Week.
- HMAS Sleuth, an auxiliary patrol boat, commissioned as HMAS Vigilant on 12 November 1940, renamed HMAS Sleuth on 17 April 1944 and HMAS Hawk on 13 March 1945. Paid off on 12 November 1945.
