= Patterns II =

Pencil and paper game

- Designers: Sid Sackson
- Years active: 1969-present
- Players: 3 or more

Patterns II is a pencil and paper game developed by Sid Sackson for 3 or more players. It emphasizes the use of inductive logic and scientific analysis to discover a hidden pattern of symbols within a matrix of grid spaces.

== Gameplay ==
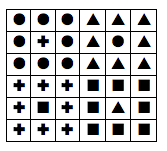
One possible pattern used in a game of Patterns II.

One player, the Designer, designs a pattern and then places a symbol within each cell of a 6x6 grid using an agreed upon set of symbols (e.g., plus, circle, triangle, square, star). The Designer’s pattern can be based upon visual symmetries, mathematical algorithms, or other method (see example pattern). The Designer's pattern is not shown to the other players, but must be discovered by them through the game play.

Each player of the game receives a paper with a blank 6x6 grid of cells on it and a listing of the symbols used for the game. Players place a tick mark in the lower right corner of cells in the grid if they would like to know the symbol the Designer placed there. Players pass their grids to the Designer, who fills in the ticked grid cells with the correct symbol, and then passes the grids back to their respective Players.

Players look over the information provided by the Designer and try to discern what patterns exist. Each player can ask for additional information on grid cell contents from the Designer, and can submit multiple requests for information. However, the more information a player requests, the less their maximum score can become.

After a player thinks he or she knows the pattern within the 6x6 grid, he or she fills in the rest of the grid with appropriate symbols and gives the grid to the Designer to score. The Designer reviews the completed grid and scores it as follows: +0 for each cell where the Designer filled in the symbol for the Player, +1 for each cell correctly induced by the Player, and -1 for each cell incorrectly induced by the Player. Each Player’s score is the sum of points across all the cells, hence scores may range from -36 (total guess, and all incorrect) through +36 (a “mind reader” who got all the symbols correct). The Designer’s score is twice the difference between the highest player’s score and the lowest player’s score (i.e., 2x(Highest-Lowest) ). This rewards a pattern that one player discovers easily and another player has great difficulty understanding.

There are usually enough rounds in the game so that each player can be Designer once. Each person’s score is the sum of scores for each round, and the person with the highest score is the winner.

As there is no rule defining what constitutes a pattern, a viable strategy for the Designer could be to choose a very simple pattern with a flaw in one cell. Players not asking about the cell with the flaw are likely to score well, where as players that do are likely to score poorly, resulting in a high score for the Designer.
