= Michael Cassidy =

Michael or Mike Cassidy may refer to:

- Michael Cassidy (Canadian politician) (1937–2025)
- Michael E. Cassidy (born 1955), American politician
- Michael Cassidy (actor) (born 1983), American film and television actor
- Michael Cassidy (sailor) (1837–1908), American Civil War sailor and Medal of Honor recipient
- Mike Cassidy (entrepreneur), American entrepreneur; CEO and co-founder of Internet start-ups
- Mike Cassidy (Canadian football) (1926–2011), American and Canadian football player
- Mike Cassidy (spearfisher), Guamanian spearfisher
- Mick Cassidy (born 1973), English rugby league player
- Michael Cassidy (evangelist) (born 1936), South African Christian evangelist
