= Stephen Cassidy =

American labor leader

Stephen Cassidy was the longest serving President of the Uniformed Firefighters Association of Greater New York (UFA) in its 100-year history. He was first elected to the position in August 2002 and is the only UFA President in the union's history to be elected directly out of a firehouse. In 2016, Cassidy resigned his position as UFA President to serve as the executive director of the New York City Fire Pension Fund. In 2018, following his arrest for driving while intoxicated, New York City Fire Commissioner Daniel Nigro removed Cassidy from his position as executive director of the New York City Fire Pension Fund.

The UFA is the largest firefighters’ union local in the United States, representing more than 8,500 active and 15,000 retired New York City Firefighters. The union is tasked with ensuring the health and safety of the city's firefighters.

As a New York City Fire Department (FDNY) firefighter, Cassidy spent the first 15 years of his career at Engine 236 in East New York, Brooklyn. He is a regular commentator on labor and public safety issues in some of New York City’s editorial pages and broadcast news programs. Under his leadership, the UFA has led campaigns to educate New Yorkers and their elected leaders on first responder issues, which have resulted in the preservation of staffing and community firehouses scheduled for closure by the City of New York.

Cassidy served from 2006 to 2011 on the National Advisory Council (NAC) of the U.S. Department of Homeland Security (Federal Emergency Management Agency) advocating for the nation’s emergency responders. He was appointed by President George W. Bush to a four-year term (January 2007 – December 2010) with the national Medal of Valor Review Board. Cassidy also served on the Scientific and Technical Advisory Committee for the James L. Zadroga 9/11 Health and Compensation Act and as a member of the September 11th Worker Protection Task Force. In September 2008, Cassidy was appointed to the International Association of Fire Fighters (IAFF) Hazardous Materials and Weapons of Mass Destruction (Hazmat/) Advisory board.

Cassidy is the lead trustee and Vice-Chairman on the FDNY Pension and Investment Boards, with $11 billion in assets. He is also the Treasurer of the New York City Municipal Labor Committee (MLC), an umbrella organization of all New York City municipal unions, negotiating health care benefits for more than 600,000 municipal workers and retirees. He holds the position of Vice President and Executive Board member of the New York City Central Labor Council, a coalition of over 300 unions representing 1.3 million workers.

Cassidy serves as Chairman of the Widows’ and Children's Fund, which benefits the widows and children of New York City firefighters who have died in the line-of-duty. He is on the board of directors of the Thomas R. Elsasser Fund, which supports the families of active New York City firefighters who died in non-line-of-duty incidents, and the Scholarship Fund, which aids the families of all New York City firefighters.

In 2012, the UFA and other FDNY unions helped create the New York City Firefighters Disaster Relief Fund to aid hundreds of FDNY first responders who suffered the catastrophic loss of their homes in Hurricane Sandy.

== Advocacy and leadership ==
In 2016, the UFA published a white paper revealing that the City of New York had been underreporting emergency response times in its public data reports (http://www.ufanyc.org/pdf/022916.pdf). The city subsequently admitted that what Cassidy had been arguing in public for years about response times was true.

=== James L. Zadroga 9/11 Health & Compensation Act ===
Cassidy and the UFA leadership aggressively called upon the federal government to provide medical care for firefighters and other first responders impacted by the September 11 attacks in 2001 (9/11). This resulted in the passage of the James L. Zadroga 9/11 Health and Compensation Act in 2011, which ensures that those affected by 9/11 continue to receive medical monitoring and treatment services for 9/11-related health problems.

As a member of the Scientific and Technical Advisory Committee for the James L. Zadroga 9/11 Health and Compensation Act, Cassidy advocated having various cancers covered under the act. In early June 2012, Dr. John Howard, World Trade Center Program Administrator, agreed to add cancer. Mr. Cassidy told Thomson Reuters, "No group suffered greater exposure to the 9/11 toxins than New York City Firefighters. We toiled at the site for months on end, throughout the rescue and recovery efforts. While this inclusion of cancers will not solve the health issues of those that are sick, it is a critically important decision towards protecting their families."

The UFA then lobbied aggressively for a permanent extension of the Zadroga Act, which was passed by the United States Congress in December 2015. U.S. House Speaker Paul Ryan announced at the time that the $8.1 billion extension would ensure lifetime healthcare for 9/11 survivors. In an op-ed published in the New York Post, Cassidy wrote: “The Zadroga extension does more than just recognize the sacrifices of firefighters and first responders here in New York. It signals to all Americans that Congress understands its responsibility to those who will risk their lives, should another catastrophic terrorist attack take place.”

=== September 11th Memorial ===
Cassidy was a vocal advocate for remembering the New York City firefighters and other first responder victims of the 9/11 attacks on America. In an op-ed in the New York Post, Cassidy wrote, “It is only through this commitment by our military, firefighters and police officers in communities throughout America that the homeland will be kept secure. What we seek is a fitting memorial that reflects the memory and sacrifice of the victims, the rescuers and their families and all affected. The memorial must be pure, true and virtuous, focused solely on memorializing the events of 9/11.”

Cassidy advocated for the National September 11 Memorial & Museum to separately and uniquely recognize the first responders who risked and sacrificed their lives on that day, calling for each first responder's name, badge number, division, battalion, unit and rank to be listed. Cassidy wrote, “Separate recognition is not about entitlement or considering rescuers as “above” any other victims of the day. It's about recognizing that first responders risked and sacrificed their lives so others could live.”

The memorial’s architect Michael Arad and Mayor of New York City Michael Bloomberg opposed this plan, instead calling for a random listing of all 9/11 victims. On December 13, 2006, following public pressure by Cassidy, a plan was finalized to list fallen members of the FDNY, New York City Police Department, and all other first responders together by command or company.

=== Fire company closures ===
For three years in a row, from 2009 to 2011, Mayor Bloomberg attempted to close 20 fire companies, as the UFA fought off these efforts. In 2009, Mayor Bloomberg attempted to close 20 fire companies and was stopped by the UFA.

In 2010, Mayor Bloomberg threatened to close 20 more fire companies to reduce the city’s $3.3 billion deficit. The UFA launched a high-visibility campaign in an effort to save the fire companies from closure and all were eventually saved.

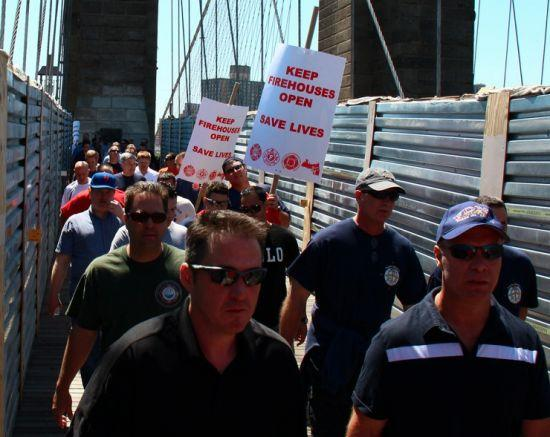
Thousands of New Yorkers stream across Brooklyn Bridge to close 20 FDNY fire companies in June 2011

On June 3, 2011, over 15,000 New Yorkers joined firefighters in marching across the Brooklyn Bridge to a rally outside of New York City Hall to protest another Mayor Bloomberg plan to shut fire companies. Cassidy told the gathering: “Even closing one neighborhood firehouse endangers communities. Closing 20 fire companies would cause a collapse of the FDNY emergency response grid. In today's world of terrorism, an ineffective fire department is unthinkable after the attacks on the World Trade Center."

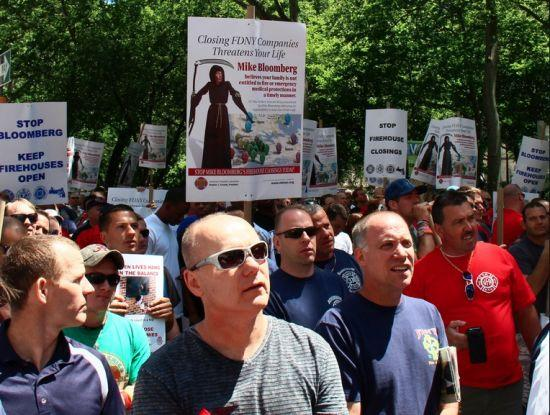
New Yorkers protest a June 2011 plan to close FDNY fire companies

(https://www.youtube.com/watch?feature=player_embedded&v=GV5XH7yWbqA#!)

=== Deutsche Bank fatal fire ===
On August 18, 2007, a fire ravaged the condemned Deutsche Bank building adjacent to the World Trade Center site. The fire claimed the lives of two New York City firefighters and injured more than 100 other firefighters who were forced to jump from the high-rise tower onto scaffolding hundreds of feet above Manhattan's streets.

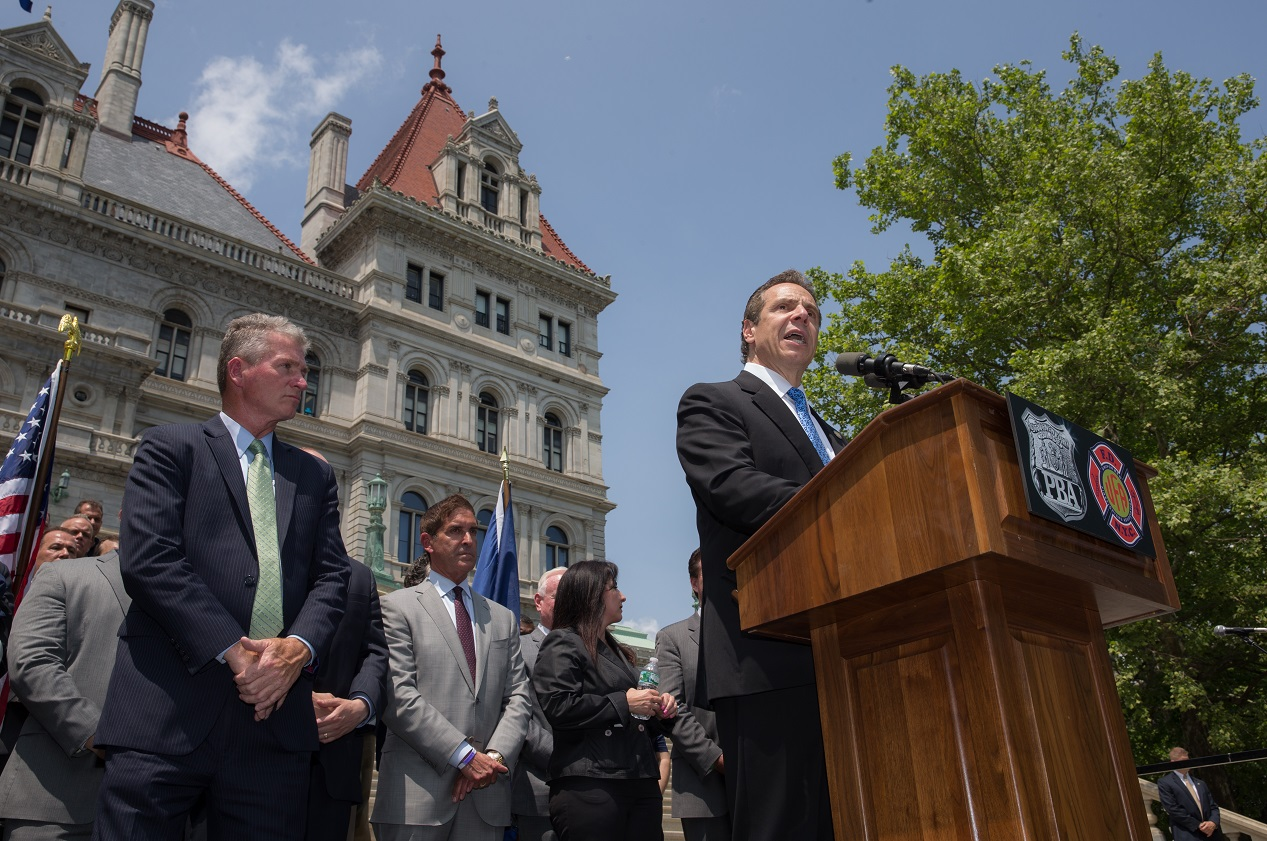
Governor Andrew Cuomo was a keynote speaker at rally for NYC Firefighters and Police Officers disability protection legislation (2015)

Cassidy and the UFA immediately called for an independent investigation into how two firefighters died and scores of others were injured fighting a fire in a high-rise toxic, vacant building that was under deconstruction. As a result of continuing pressure from the UFA, on August 23, 2007, the New York Post published an editorial calling for the Fire Commissioner to be terminated, stating, "Mayor Bloomberg needs Commissioner Nicholas Scoppetta’s badge on his desk by close of business day.” In a New York 1 interview almost a year after the fire, Cassidy said, "Two of our firefighters died protecting what is essentially a vertical Love Canal which was abandoned years ago. An independent investigation needs to move forward, subpoenas need to be issued and people must be compelled to give testimony under oath. No matter what happened the fire department ultimately had the ability to prevent this tragedy.”

In December 2008, UFA leaders held a press conference to speak out about the results of the Manhattan District Attorney's investigation into the fire. Cassidy spoke of the fire department's attempts to whitewash the tragedy and said, "The DA's report acknowledges what the UFA has maintained since the tragic August 18, 2007 fire. The top leadership of the FDNY failed in their responsibility to properly inspect and supervise the deconstruction and abatement of the Deutsche Bank Building. Despite numerous reports sent up to the top level of the Department, no inspection or fire plan was formulated which would have prevented this tragedy."

== Honors and awards ==
In 2016, City & State named Steve Cassidy as one of the most powerful 100 people in New York City politics.

Cassidy was a recipient of the 2016 Ellis Island Medal of Honor, which since 1986 has acknowledged individuals who exemplify American values of patriotism, freedom, liberty and compassion in their work. Other recipients have included Hillary Rodham Clinton, Donald Trump, Henry Kissinger, Colin Powell, Rosa Parks, Muhammad Ali and Frank Sinatra.

In 2015, Cassidy served as grand marshal of the 40th Annual Queens County, New York Saint Patrick's Day Parade, held each year in Rockaway Beach, New York.

== See also ==
- Collapse of the World Trade Center
- Fire Department of New York
- Health effects of the September 11, 2001 attacks
- Rescue and recovery effort after the September 11, 2001 attacks
- September 11 attacks
- September 11, 2001 radio communications
