= Elaine Cassidy (disambiguation) =

Elaine Cassidy (born 1979) is an Irish actress

Elaine Cassidy may also refer to:

- Elaine Cassidy (Doctors), fictional character from the soap opera Doctors
- Elaine Cassidy (mayor) (1930–2014), Australian teacher and politician
