= Helen Cassaday =

Professor of Behavioural Neuroscience

Helen Cassaday is Professor of Behavioural Neuroscience, School of Psychology, Faculty of Science, University of Nottingham.

== Education ==
Cassaday did her BA, MA (Hons) in Experimental Psychology, at University College, University of Oxford (1986,1990); her PhD was in Psychopharmacology, at Institute of Psychiatry, University of London (1990).

== Research ==
Her research is focused on investigating the underlying biology of associative learning processes, fundamental to normal cognition in animals and humans.

Her research group investigates the underlying biology of associative learning processes, fundamental to normal cognition, in laboratory rats and mice. The animal learning theories can also be applied to our understanding of age-related cognitive decline, as well as to human diseases in which associative processes are disordered. When there is a time gap between events, we are less able to make a connection between them in learning and later memory. Thus it is harder to keep track of things that could in fact be causally related, in order - for example - to know that even distant engine noise can predict a future hazard or to anticipate dinner based on the smell of raw ingredients. The ability successfully to bridge a time gap between events is known to deteriorate with age in humans and other animals. This line of work (funded by the BBSRC) aims to identify the neural substrates of trace conditioning, and to compare these with those of delay-dependent forgetting measured in other procedures.

In schizophrenia, her team finds that learning occurs inappropriately, about stimuli that would normally be treated as irrelevant, redundant or in some other way indistinct. This line of work (funded by the MRC and Wellcome Trust) has focused on the neural substrates of selective learning. Recent work compared the effects of localised treatments within nucleus accumbens on latent inhibition, based on past experience with the cue or ‘acquired salience’, and cue competition through overshadowing, based on relative intensity of the cue or ‘intrinsic salience’. To promote translation of these findings to our understanding of human disorder, a number of her graduate students (Ellen Migo, Ebrahim Kantini, Zhimin He, Meghan Thurston, Becci Gould) have also successfully established associative learning procedures suitable for use with human participants.

In addition to projects on selective learning mechanisms and their dysfunction, she and her colleagues have shown the validity of a non-invasive objective measure of stress in laboratory mice (Ann Fitchett, BBSRC-funded studentship, welfare remit).

== Publications ==
Cassaday has published numerous peer reviewed journal articles and contributed to many academic books.
