= Robert Abbott (game designer) =

American game inventor

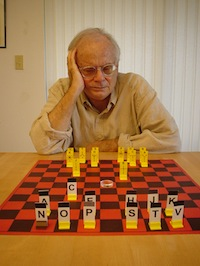
- Robert Abbott, working on his game Confusion
- Born: March 2, 1933; St. Louis, Missouri, US
- Died: February 20, 2018 (aged 84)
- Occupation: Computer programmer
- Known for: Inventing logic mazes and creation of several games

Robert Abbott (March 2, 1933 – February 20, 2018) was an American game inventor, sometimes referred to by fans as "The Official Grand Old Man of Card Games". Though early in his life he worked as a computer programmer with the IBM 360 assembly language, he began designing games in the 1950s.

Two of his more popular creations include the chess variant Baroque chess (also known as Ultima) and Crossings, which later became Epaminondas. Eleusis was also successful, appearing in several card game collections, such as Hoyle's Rules of Games and New Rules for Classic Games, among others. In 1963, Abbott himself released a publication, Abbott's New Card Games, which included instructions for all of his card games, in addition to Baroque chess. Abbott also invented logic mazes, the first of which appeared in Martin Gardner's Mathematical Games column in the October 1962 issue of Scientific American. One of the more prominent of these is Theseus and the Minotaur, which was originally published in the book Mad Mazes. His game Confusion was named "Best New Abstract Strategy Game" for 2012 by GAMES Magazine.

== Biography ==
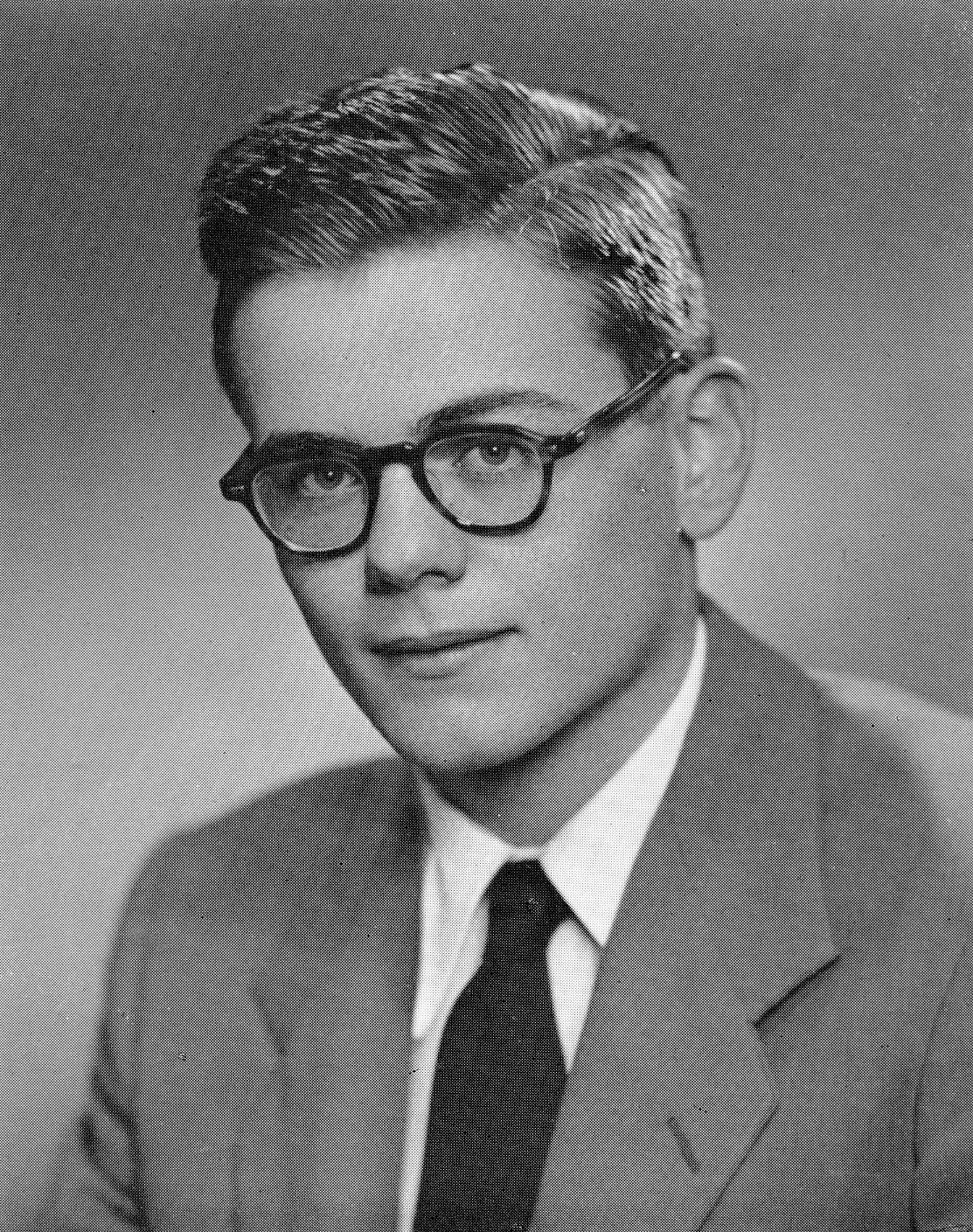
Abbott's yearbook picture at St. Louis Country Day School in 1951 as a senior

Abbott was born in St. Louis, Missouri, and attended St. Louis Country Day School. Abbott went to Yale for two years, then attended the University of Colorado for another two, but never graduated. Soon after, Abbott moved to New York, where he and his games were discovered by Martin Gardner. In 1963, after Abbott's book, Abbott's New Card Games, received only moderate success, he "got tired of being poor" and moved back to St. Louis. There, he became a computer programmer at the Washington University in St. Louis Computer Research Laboratory. In 1965, he moved back to New York, where he continued to work as a computer programmer, mostly with the IBM 360 assembly language.

Abbott created all of his card games during the 1950s, starting with Babel in 1951, and ending with Auction in 1956. Soon after, he moved to New York City, where the rules for his game Eleusis were first published by Martin Gardner in his Mathematical Games column. Motivated by the article, Abbott self-published the rules for four of his card games in the book Four New Card Games in 1962, which he sold by mail. In 1963, the book Abbott's New Card Games was published by Sol Stein of Stein and Day, containing the rules for all eight of his card games and the rules for his chess variant, Baroque chess. In 1968, the publisher Funk & Wagnalls published a paperback edition of Abbott's New Card Games, in which Abbott slightly modified the rules of Baroque chess, but these changes never became popular. Around the same time that Abbott's New Card Games was published, Abbott sent his maze, Traffic Maze in Floyd's Knob, to Martin Gardner. This was the first logic maze to be published, appearing in Gardner's Mathematical Games column.

After that time, Abbott created various mazes, most of which appeared in the books SuperMazes and Mad Mazes. In 2008, RBA Libros published a Spanish version of his book Abbott's New Card Games, under the title Diez juegos que no se parecen a nada, which translates to Ten games that do not resemble anything. This version was not just a Spanish translation of the original, however; the most up-to-date rules for the various games were used; in addition, the rules for Eleusis Express and Confusion were included. In 2010, his Where are the Cows? maze was published by the Oxford University Press in Ian Stewart's book Cows in the Maze. In 2011, his game Confusion was published by Stronghold Games. The game was named "Best New Abstract Strategy Game" for 2012 by GAMES Magazine.

== Logic mazes ==
Abbott was the inventor of a style of maze called logic mazes. A logic maze has a set of rules, ranging from the basic (such as "you cannot make left turns") to the extremely complicated. These mazes are also called "Multi-State mazes". The reason for this name is that sometimes you can return to a position you were in before, but be traveling in a different direction. That change in direction can put you in a different state and open up different choices for you. One example, from the book SuperMazes, would be a rolling-die maze. Where you can move from a particular square depends on what number is facing up on the die. If you return to that same square, the die may be in a different state, with a different number on top. Thus, you would have different options than the first time.

=== Traffic Maze in Floyd's Knob ===
The first logic maze ever published, Traffic Maze in Floyd's Knob, appeared in the October 1962 issue of Scientific American in the Mathematical Games column.

The maze looks like a street grid, with arrows pointing down various roads at each intersection. When one comes to an intersection, only arrows leading from the road you are on to another road can be followed. One must continue in this fashion, following the arrows at the intersection, until the end is reached. When you come to an intersection from one direction, you have different options for which road to take than you would coming into the intersection from another direction; therefore, this can be defined as a "multi-state" or "logic" maze.

=== Where Are the Cows? ===
Where are the Cows? was one of Abbott's most difficult mazes. It first appeared in his book SuperMazes. Abbott warns readers that it "may be too difficult for anyone to solve." Since then, it has also appeared as the titular maze in the book Cows in the Maze.

The complexity in Where are the Cows? includes self-reference, changing rules, and flow charts. It is also worded so as to provoke confusion between an object (such as red text), a reference to an object (such as the word "red"), and even more subtle references (the word "word"). The maze ends up being so complicated that it can even be difficult to work out the next move, let alone the end. In this maze, you have to use two hands, each starting at a different place. The instructions in one box might have to do with the box that the other hand is in, boxes you have already left, or complex combinations of the two.

=== Theseus and the Minotaur ===
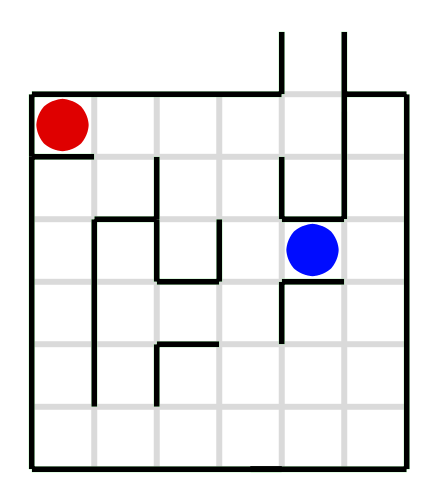
A maze showing Theseus (blue) and the Minotaur (red)

Theseus and the Minotaur is another of Abbott's better-known mazes. It first appeared in his book Mad Mazes. Like Where are the Cows? in SuperMazes, Abbott said that this "is the hardest maze in the book; in fact, it is possible that no one will solve it". Since then, several different versions of it have appeared, made by others, following the same theme, both on paper and in electronic forms.

== Games ==
Abbott has created several games, including card games, board games, and one equipment game. As a whole, his games are not of particular fame, although they have some unique elements that set them apart from mainstream games. For instance, the card game Metamorphosis is a complex trick-taking game. As you play the game, the rules change three times, so it is as if you are playing four different games that are threaded together.

=== Baroque chess ===
Baroque chess, or Ultima, was the only board game in the book Abbott's New Card Games. Abbott's reasoning for including this non-card game in a card game book was that chess pieces are as plentiful as playing cards, and in this book, he wanted to introduce new games that did not require special equipment. Abbott's friends, once he started teaching it to them, began to call the game "Abbott's Ultima," which he did not like at all. However, the publisher, Sol Stein, preferred the name "Ultima," so that is the title that was used in the book.

=== Eleusis ===
Eleusis is probably Abbott's most prominent game, due to its metaphors and its suitability for use as a teaching tool. He invented it in 1956, and it appeared in his self-published book Four New Card Games. It was also published in the book Abbott's New Card Games a year later. Martin Gardner wrote about it in his Mathematical Games column in the June 1959 issue of Scientific American. Basically, the gameplay consists of the dealer choosing a secret rule dictating how cards are to be played, and the players playing cards in an attempt to figure out the rule through inductive reasoning. In 1973, Abbott decided to improve Eleusis; the result was considered to be far better than the original, with various improvements to the layouts and gameplay making it work quite a bit better. Martin Gardner wrote about this version in the October 1977 issue of Scientific American. Abbott also self-published a pamphlet in 1977 with the rules for the improved version, titled The New Eleusis. It has appeared in several card game collections, such as Hoyle's Rules of Games and New Rules for Classic Games, among others.

=== Confusion ===
Abbott initially created the game Confusion in the 1970s, and had it in finished form by 1980. The game was published in Germany by Franjos in 1992; Abbott was not satisfied with this version, however, due to several flaws in it. The rules were published in the Spanish translation of his book Abbott's New Card Games in 2008, but the game did not get published in North America until 2011. This Stronghold Games version was named "Best New Abstract Strategy Game" for 2012 by GAMES Magazine. The game is based on the idea of not knowing what your pieces are or what they do at the beginning of the game. His game Eleusis uses a similar idea, in that you do not know how cards are to be played at the beginning; George Brancaccio, someone Abbott worked with at the Bank of New York, commented on this, saying "In your game Eleusis, you don't know what cards can be played. Why don't you make a board game where you don't know how pieces move?" This is what gave Abbott the idea, and he began work on it soon after.

== Published work ==
- Four New Card Games (1962)
- Abbott's New Card Games (1963, again in paperback in 1968)
- The New Eleusis (1977)
- Mad Mazes (1990)
- SuperMazes (1997)
- Auction 2002 and Eleusis (2001)
- Diez juegos que no se parecen a nada [Ten games that do not resemble anything] (2008, translated by Marc Figueras)
