= Sleuth (card game) =

1971 strategy deduction card game

- Other names: La Chasse aux Diamants
- Designers: Sid Sackson
- Illustrators: Shannon Crutchfield; Paul Herbert
- Publishers: 3M; Avalon Hill; Eagle-Gryphon Games; Face to Face Games
- Publication: 1971; 55 years ago
- Genres: Card game; Deduction game; Strategy game
- Players: 3-7
- Playing time: 30-45 minutes
- Age range: 10+
- Website: https://www.eaglegames.net/Sleuth-p/101495.htm

Sleuth is a strategy deduction card game designed by Sid Sackson and published by 3M in 1971. It is a reimplementation of the 1967 game The Case of the Elusive Assassin without the game board. The object of the game is to deduce the identity of a missing gem by questioning other players and gathering evidence, similar to Cluedo.

== Gameplay ==
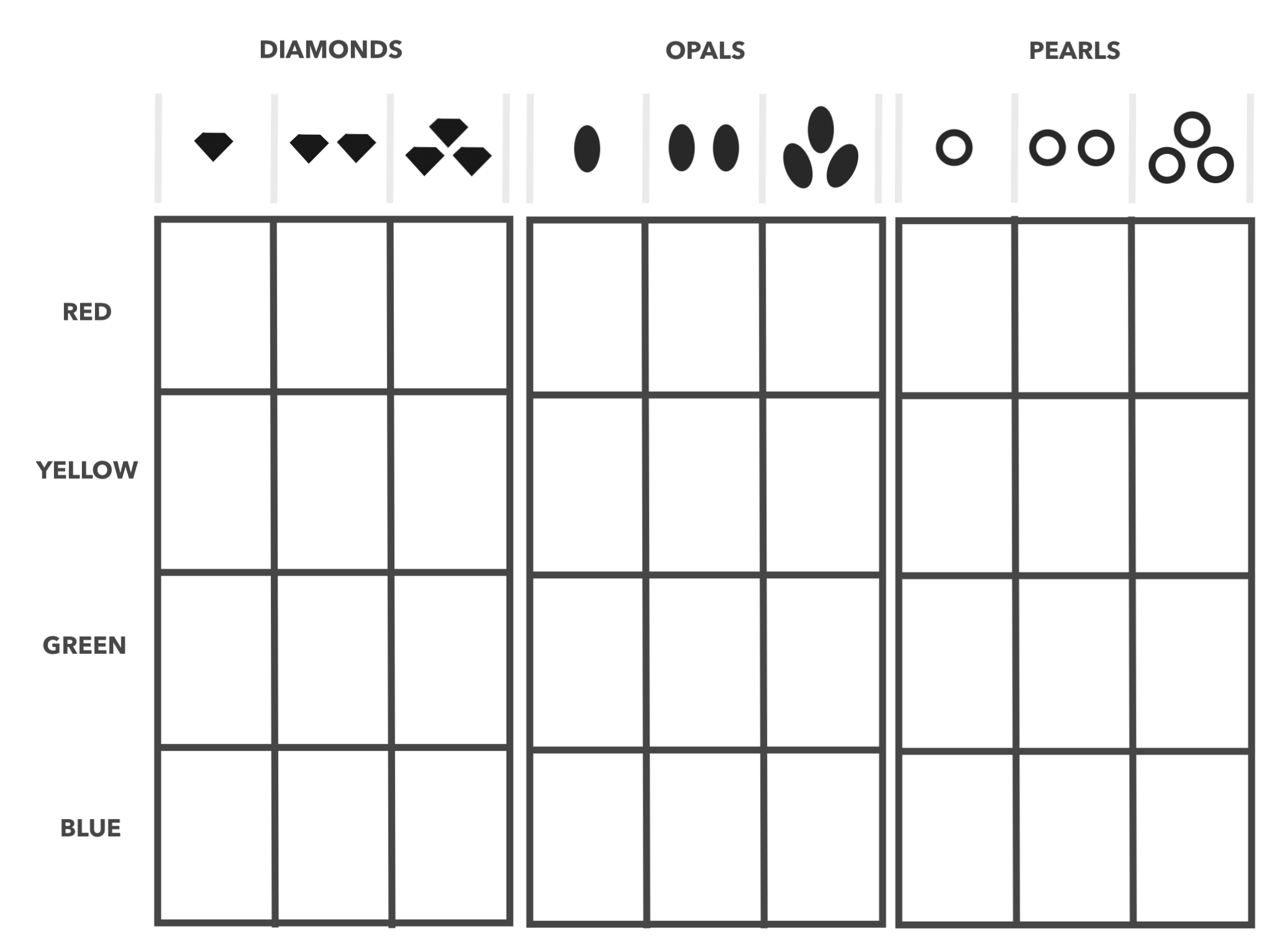
Information Sheet

Sleuth is played with a deck of 36 Gem Cards, with each card picturing a gem (diamond, pearl, or opal), type (solitaire, pair, or cluster), and colour (red, blue, green, or yellow). A second deck of 54 Search Cards is also used, with each card representing a single element, a combination of two elements, or a free choice. One card is randomly removed from the Gem deck at the start of the game to be the missing gemstone. The remainder of the deck is split evenly among players and any cards that do not divide evenly are turned face up for all players to see. Four Search Cards are dealt face-up to each player.

On a player's turn, they choose a player to interrogate and place a Search Card face up in front of them. If a one element Search Card is played, the subject of interrogation announces to all players how many Gem Cards they have featuring that element. If a two element Search Card is played, the subject announces the number of Gem Cards they hold featuring that combination of elements and secretly passes them to the interrogator for them to record and return. If a free choice Search Card is played, the player may choose to use it as a one or two element card. At the end of their turn, the interrogator draws a Search Card to add to their hand.

Players record information on their Information Sheets until a player believes they can identify the missing gem. Once a player announces they have solved the mystery, they secretly check the missing Gem Card and, if correct, is the winner. If incorrect, they are out of the game and must continue answering interrogations as the game continues until the gem is identified. If a player believes interrogating a certain opponent will enable them to identify the missing gem, on their turn they may any question of that subject regardless of their Search Cards before attempting to identify the gem.

=== Super Sleuth ===
Super Sleuth, or Supersleuth, is a more difficult rules variation of Sleuth. In it, the subject as normal declares the number of cards they hold featuring a given combination when a two element Search Card is played, but does not pass their cards to the interrogator. Cards are never passed between players.

== Reception ==
In The Playboy Winner's Guide to Board Games, John Freeman criticized the overly compact design for its difficulty of use and concluded that "the absence of any sort of visual activity makes the game seem–well–dull. It's not bad, but it lacks zing." Pascal Gros, writing for Issue #59 of Jeux & Stratégie, stated that fans of deduction would enjoy Sleuth, but further criticized the game for its lack of originality and repetitive gameplay.

In Issue #20 of Games & Puzzles, the magazine's panel rated the game as complex, skill-based, with high clarity of rules, presentation, and durability. Sleuth was also included as part of the 1982 and 1983 Games 100.
