= Klutz Press =

Publishing company founded in 1977

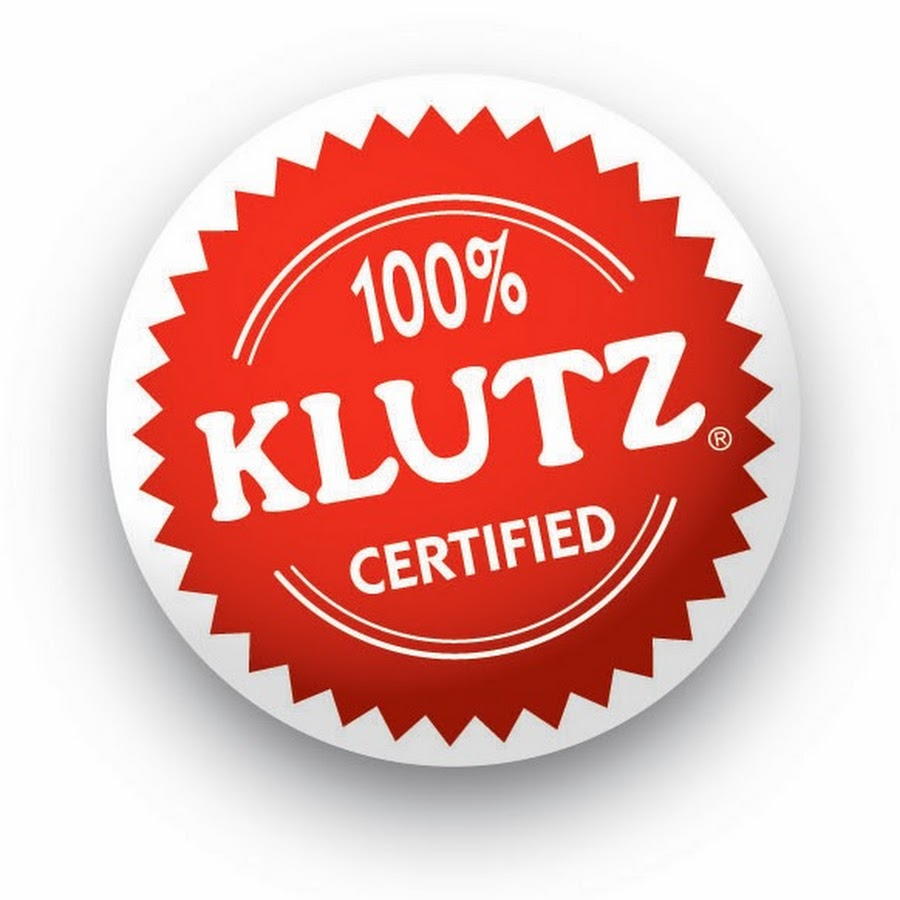
Emblem that appears on Klutz books

Klutz is a publishing company founded in Palo Alto, California, United States, in 1977. It was acquired by Canada-based Nelvana in April 2000, and became a subsidiary of Scholastic Inc. in 2002.

== History ==
The first Klutz book was a how-to guide titled Juggling for the Complete Klutz, which came provided with juggling beanbags attached in a mesh bag. The book was written by three classmates who graduated from Stanford University: Darrell Lorentzen, John Cassidy, and B.C. Rimbeaux.

Since then, the company continued to specialize in activity-driven books, sold along with other items needed for the activity. Not all the books are about developing a skill; there has also been a geography book containing, among other physical attachments, packets of rice corresponding to the average daily caloric intake among the poorest people of the world. Many of the books are spiral bound and teach different crafts. The items needed are usually included with the book, e.g. the juggling guide. The Klutz credo is: "Create wonderful things, be good, have fun."

== Selected publications ==
=== Crafts ===
- Capsters: Turn Bottle Caps into Cool Collectibles
- Felted Friends: Create Your Own Soft, Fuzzy Animals
- Knitting: Learn to Knit 6 Great Projects
- Make Clay Charms
- Mini Pom Pom Pets: Make Your Own Fuzzy Friends
- Potholders and other Loopy Projects
- Pom Pom Monster Salon
- Pom Pom Puppies: Make Your Own Adorable Dogs
- Spool Knit Jewelry
- String Art: Transform String and Pins into Works of Art
- Tissue Paper Crafts
- Twirled Paper
- Twirly Q's: Make Irresistible Cardboard Creations
- Make Your Own Washi Tape Stickers
- Window Art: Stick on! Peel off!

=== Fashion ===
- Beaded Bands: Super Stylish Bracelets Made Simple
- Bead Loom Bracelets: Learn to Make Beautiful Beaded Bracelets
- Fashion Forms: Let Your Style Take Shape
- Glossy Bands: Stretchy Bracelets to Share with Your Friends
- Headbands and Hairstyles
- Loop Loom Bracelets
- Mini Capsters Jewelry: Turn Bottle Caps into Wearable Art
- My Style Studio
- Paper Fashions: Design Your Own Styles
- Paper Fashions Fancy
- Paper Fashions Fantasy
- Safety Pin Bracelets: Transform Safety Pins into Extraordinary Bracelets
- A Book of Lanyard and Lacing: Scoubidou
- Shrink Art Jewelry
- Braids and Bows: a Book of Instruction (how to braid girls' hair)

=== Scientific ===
- Air Power: Rocket Science Made Simple
- Battery Science: Make Widgets that Work and Gadgets that Go
- Explorabook: A Kid's Science Museum in a Book
- Earthsearch: A Kid's Geography Museum in a Book
- Gotcha Gadgets: Build Electronic Gizmos to Play 20 Tricks
- LEGO Chain Reactions: Design and Build Amazing Moving Machines
- LEGO Crazy Action Contraptions
- The Solar Car Book
- Straw Shooter Jets: Make Your Own Mini Air Force

=== With Unique Toys ===
- How to Make Monstrous, Huge, Unbelievably Big Bubbles
- The Book of Impossible Objects: 25 Eye-Popping Projects to Make See & Do
- The Foxtail Book

=== How-to ===
- Cats Cradle
- Country and Blues Harmonica for the Musically Hopeless
- Juggling for the Complete Klutz
- The Klutz Book of Animation
- The Klutz Book of Knots
- The Klutz Book of Paper Airplanes
- The Klutz Book of Card Games (For Sharks and Others) (1990)
- The Book of Classic Board Games (1991)
- Tricky Video

=== Other ===
- Doodle Journal
- Doodle Journal: Write in White
- Draw Star Wars: The Clone Wars
- Kids Cooking
- Kids Shenanigans
- The Encyclopedia of Immaturity Volume I
- The Encyclopedia of Immaturity Volume II
- The Klutz Book of Inventions
- The Klutz Book of Magic
- The Official Icky Poo Book
- Thumb Wars: The Ultimate Guide
