= Cassidy Haley =

American singer-songwriter

- Origin: Los Angeles, California, United States
- Genres: Electroacoustic, experimental, indie, acoustic
- Instruments: vocals, guitar, piano
- Years active: 2005 –
- Label: Sunshine Rebel Records
- Website: http://www.cassidyhaley.com/

Cassidy Hugaert Haley is an American singer-songwriter and clothing designer based in Los Angeles.

== Early life and career ==
Haley was born in Oakland, California, and grew up in the nearby city of Richmond, California, raised by his mother. He has three sisters and two brothers. His ancestors are mainly Irish, Scottish, German, French, and Native American. As a teenager he was part of the Bay Area rave scene. Haley was among the 1999 WTO protestors in Seattle and has cited this as a formative experience in his life.

Haley has performed with circuses including the avant-garde cirque nouveau Lucent Dossier Experience at Coachella Valley Music and Arts Festival and El Circo. He performs stiltwalking and silks aerial; he performed on stilts in Las Vegas on Halloween in 2009. Haley developed design and sewing skills making costumes for himself and other circus performers, which he has applied in two clothing design companies and for his band costumes and music videos. He moved to Los Angeles to pursue his career in music and fashion.

Haley founded the company Ernte with Evan Sugarman in 2003. In 2005, he left the company to work on his music career. In 2006, Haley returned to fashion, founding a company called Skin.Graft with Jonny Cota. They were later joined by Katie Kay. Skin. Graft has been described as having "raw underground fashion and sleek, high-end couture." The company runs a downtown Los Angeles boutique, as well as producing custom designs. They presented a fall/winter collection at LA Fashion Week 2009. Haley sold his half of Skin. Graft in January 2009 to focus on his music.

American Idol (season 7) winner David Cook wore Skin. Graft designs during the competition and during public appearances. Haley is a friend of American Idol (season 8) runner-up Adam Lambert and designed pieces worn by Lambert on during the competition and on the American Idols LIVE! Tour 2009; Skin. Graft was featured in an ABC News 20/20 segment about Lambert on June 13, 2009. Other celebrities to wear Skin. Graft design include: Fergie, CariDee English, Margaret Cho, Lil Rounds, Allison Iraheta, and Tila Tequila.

In 2012 Cassidy started a new venture, RITUAL, with his girlfriend, Jillian Ann. Billed as a fashion label and a band, the official description is a "Multi-media entertainment and lifestyle company". They released their first collection, LA petite mort, in 2013 and their follow up collection, BREATHE, in July 2014 with a musical single of the same name.

== Music ==
Haley sings and plays acoustic guitar and piano. In a November 2009 interview, he said about being an independent musician, "I don't want to be developed. You know I have a really clear idea of what I want to do and how I want to sound and how I want look. But you just can't really compete with the marketing machine of a main label." He registered his own music label in December 2009, Sunshine Rebel Records. He releases his own music for sale via iTunes and eBay, and posts YouTube videos and holds online concerts for his fans.

Haley wrote and produced his debut EP album, Little Boys and Dinosaurs, using Ableton Live software. Houston Chronicle music reviewer Joey Guerra described Haley's sound as "lushly produced, dark and theatrical. It's like Trent Reznor lightened up a bit and got a bit of a groove on." It was released on iTunes on August 10, 2009. He recorded acoustic sessions of the songs on Little Boys and Dinosaurs, posting them online and collecting them in a DVD released in September 2009. He has described his musical style as "My usual response is some ramble about electronic, pop, folk, goth, and glam-rock. But, I don't know. Can't music just speak for itself?" His first full-length album on his own label is expected in spring 2010.

On August 15, 2009, Adam Lambert made a post on Twitter.com to his followers "My friend Cassidy just shot this great video..." that included a link to Haley's video for "Whiskey in Churches." The video was produced over several months, with Haley playing multiple characters using green screen technology. Following this tweet Little Boys and Dinosaurs was the third most downloaded electronic record on the iTunes chart on Monday, August 17, 2009, without having had a music label or PR campaign.

Haley performed in Los Angeles and nearby cities, sometimes performing with his band, Cassidy Haley and the Sunshine Rebels. The Sunshine Rebels is a changing assortment of performers who are part of the Los Angeles creative scene. They headlined the 8th Annual National Coming Out Day Street Festival in Las Vegas on October 3, 2009 and have played shows at the Henry Fonda Theater and several shows at The Viper Room.

== Discography ==
=== Little Boys and Dinosaurs (2009) ===
==== Track listing ====
All lyrics are written by Cassidy Haley; all music is composed by Cassidy Haley.

No.	Title	Production & Additional Musicians	Length
1.	"Whiskey in Churches"	recording – Jason Art, additional production – David Bergeaud, Land Factory Music	3:16
2.	"Little Boys and Dinosaurs"	recording – Jason Art, additional production – David Bergeaud, Land Factory Music	4:11
3.	"Daylight Breaks"	recording – Jason Art, additional production – David Bergeaud, Land Factory Music	3:42
4.	"Fly"	recording – Jason Art, additional production – David Bergeaud, Land Factory Music	3:50
5.	"Midnight Sun"	coproduction and backing vocals – Agness Twin, guitars – Ron Therrio, bass – Geoffrey Dimmick	3:54
6.	"Burn"		3:44

=== Acoustic Sessions (2009) ===
DVD of Little Boys and Dinosaurs and cover songs

=== Nostalgia (2010) ===
Limited edition compilation CD

=== The Fool (2010) ===
==== Track listing ====
No.	Title	Length
1.	"Prologue (The Fool Pt. 1)"	2:15
2.	"Fly"	2:33
3.	"Spindle"	4:25
4.	"Whiskey in Churches"	3:41
5.	"Daylight Breaks"	4:09
6.	"This Time"	4:29
7.	"Interlude (The Fool Pt. 2)"	4:04
8.	"Foolish Boy"	3:35
9.	"Burn"	4:29
10.	"Ride The Night"
11.	"Dying to Live"	4:29
12.	"Moon River"	3:31
13.	"Epilogue (The Journey Begins)"	3:30

=== The Lovers (2014) ===
==== Track listing ====
No.	Title	Length
1.	"Everything"	3:44
2.	"Never Again"	3:34
3.	"Wandering the Night"	4:18
4.	"Only Human"	3:56
5.	"Breakdown"	5:11
6.	"So Simple"	3:35
7.	"Innocence"	5:11
8.	"Vagabonds to the Marching Troupes"	3:35
9.	"Bones Gone Grey"	3:44
