= Joe Cassidy (footballer, born 1891) =

Irish footballer

Personal information
- Full name: Patrick Joseph Cassidy
- Date of birth: 1891
- Place of birth: Dublin, Ireland
- Position: Goalkeeper

Senior career*
Years	Team	Apps	(Gls)
1911–1912	Bohemians		
1912–1913	Shelbourne		
1913	Grimsby Town (trial)	1	(0)
- * Club domestic league appearances and goals

Patrick Joseph Cassidy (1891 – after 1912) was an Irish footballer who played as a goalkeeper.
