= George Cassidy =

George Cassidy may refer to:

- George W. Cassidy (1836–1892), U. S. representative from Nevada, 1881–1885
- One of Butch Cassidy's many aliases
- George Cassidy (Australian footballer) (1905–1985), Australian footballer for Melbourne
- George Henry Cassidy (1942–2024), Anglican bishop of Southwell and Nottingham
- George Cassidy (coach) (1881–1966), college football coach
- George Cassidy (jazz musician) (1936–2023), jazz musician and music teacher of Van Morrison
