= Cassidy Possum Tjapaltjarri =

Australian Aboriginal artist (1923–2006)

Cassidy Possum (Stockman) Tjapaltjarri (1923 – 25 February 2006) was an Australian Aboriginal spokesman, a tribal elder and well known visual artist.

He was born at Napperby in the Northern Territory around 1923. It is unclear exactly when he started painting, however, he was a regular painter during his many years as a pensioner at Mount Allan. He was one of the most flamboyant figures in this small community and was an elder of the Anmatyerre tribe. His traditional country covered a large tract of land (several thousand square miles) and included many important dreaming sites. His artwork and art themes were taken from his country and included caterpillar, men's love story, possum and men's dreamings.

Cassidy's full brother was Clifford Possum Tjapaltjarri, one of the most famous of all "first generation" contemporary Indigenous Australian artists. Clifford died in mid-2002.

Since Clifford died Cassidy painted what he called "circle" dreaming which was part of a powerful dreaming story that was used in the sand paintings to bring Clifford home. These paintings were interspersed with the Possum Dreaming which he inherited from Clifford. These two dreamings were dramatically different in their construction, composition and colours to all of his earlier paintings. Cassidy was one of the first generation artists who painted important and powerful dreamings that preserved his culture.

== See also ==
- Australian Aboriginal Art
- Papunya Tula
