= Patrick Sarsfield Cassidy =

Irish-American journalist, revolutionary

Patrick Sarsfield Cassidy (c.1850 - 1903) was an Irish-American journalist, poet and revolutionary.

== Biography ==
Born circa 1850 in Ireland, in either Dunkineely, County Donegal or Sligo. He emigrated to America at the age of 16.

He was a pioneering journalist worked as business editor of the New York Sunday Mercury.

He became head of the Fenian Council in 1886 after a power struggle with O'Donovan Rossa in which Rossa accused him of being an agent provocateur for the British. Cassidy was chiefly famous for his exposure of O'Donovan Rossa.

He died in Christchurch, New Zealand on 18 April 1903, and is buried in the Linwood Cemetery, Christchurch. He had been manager of the New Zealand Times of Wellington for a time since 1896, and had a brother and nephew in Christchurch and Canterbury.

== Bibliography ==
- The Borrowed Bride: A Fairy Love Legend of Donegal (1892)
