= Jim Cassidy (coach) =

Australian rules footballer (1878–1956)

Personal information
- Full name: James Joseph Cassidy
- Born: 2 May 1878; Scotland
- Died: 3 April 1956 (aged 77); Nathalia

Playing career
Years	Club	Games (Goals)
1897, 1909	Footscray (VFA)	

Coaching career
Years	Club	Games (W–L–D)
1908–09, 1912–15, 1918	Footscray(VFA)	
1926	Footscray	8 (1–7–0)

Career highlights
- Premiership coach (VFA) 1908, 1913

James Joseph Cassidy (2 May 1878 – 3 April 1956 ) was an Australian rules football coach who coached Footscray in the Victorian Football League (VFL).

Cassidy played and coached Footscray in the Victorian Football Association (VFA) prior to his appointment as senior VFL coach. He coached Footscray to the 1908 and 1913 VFA premierships, then later worked at Footscray as a club trainer. In the 1926 VFL season, Cassidy was in charge of Footscray's seniors for the first eight rounds, before resigning. The club managed just one win under Cassidy but it was just their second season in the league. In 2010 he was inducted into the Bulldogs Hall of Fame.
