= Sid Sackson =

American game designer (1920–2002)

Sid Sackson (February 4, 1920 in Chicago – November 6, 2002) was an American board game designer and collector, best known as the creator of the business game Acquire.

== Career ==
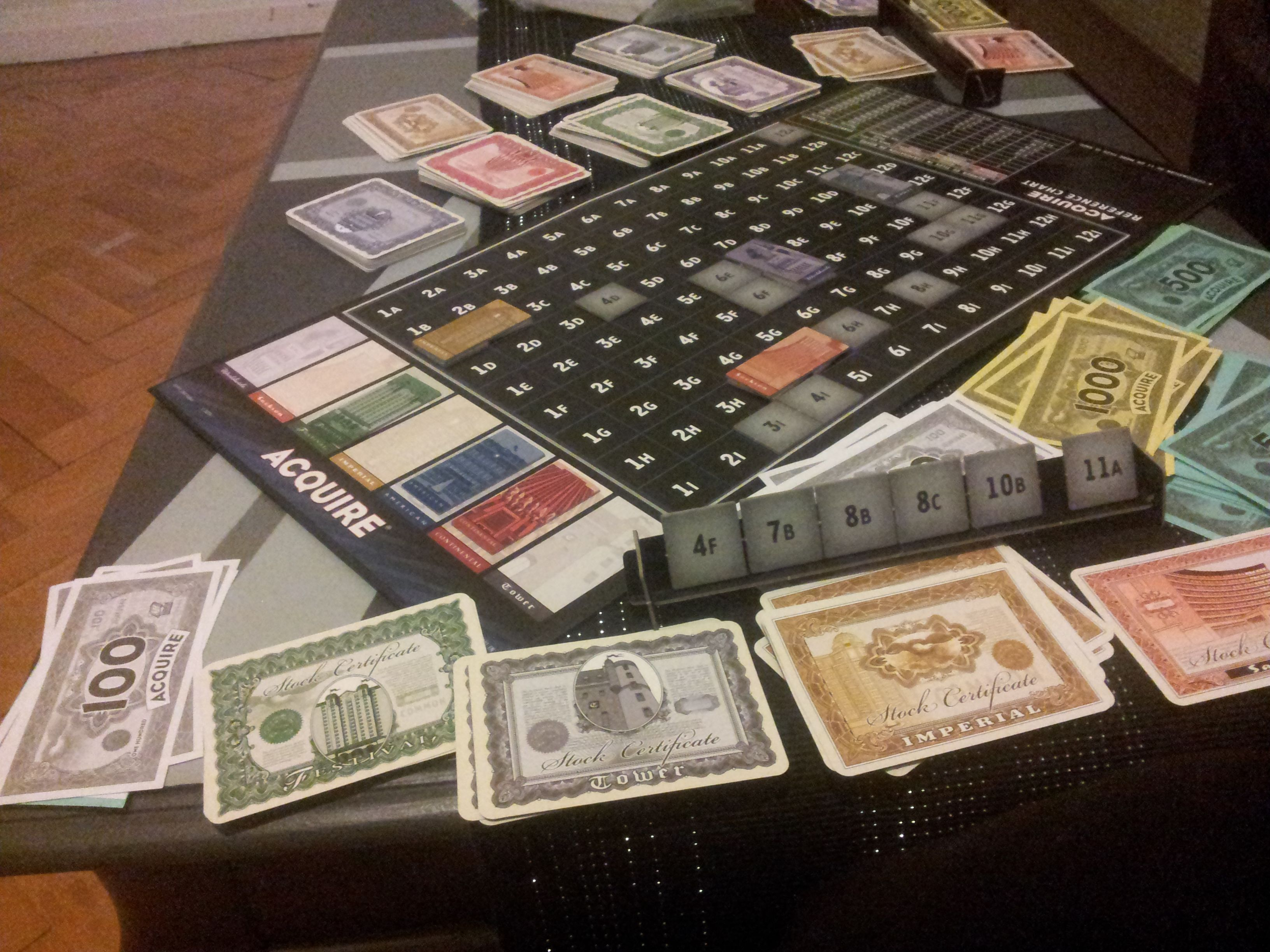
Acquire

Sackson's most popular creation is probably the business game Acquire. Other games he designed include Can't Stop and Focus (Domination), which won the prestigious German Spiel des Jahres game design award in 1981.

Other notable works include his books, especially A Gamut of Games and Card Games Around the World; both titles include a large array of rules for games both new and old, and Sackson himself invented a number of the games covered by these works.

For several years in the mid-1970s, Sid Sackson wrote a monthly column for Strategy & Tactics magazine called “Sackson on Games” in which he reviewed games (other than wargames).

Sackson's book collection was arranged in groups of five books so he would know if a book was missing and which one it was.

Sackson collected games throughout his life; at the time of his death, his collection was estimated at over 18,000 titles. Many of those were unique, sent to him by hopeful game developers who wanted Sackson's advice. At one point in his life, Sackson turned down an offer to bring his collection elsewhere for permanent safekeeping; the games were sold at a series of auctions after his death, breaking up the collection. Sackson's personal papers are stored at The Strong in Rochester, New York.

== Honors ==
Sackson was inducted into the Academy of Adventure Gaming Arts & Design's Hall of Fame, along with Acquire, in 2011.

He was honored as a "famous game designer" by being featured as the king of diamonds in Flying Buffalo's 2011 Famous Game Designers Playing Card Deck.

== Games ==
Some of Sackson's notable games include:

- Acquire
- Black Monday
- Bowling Solitaire
- BuyWord
- Can't Stop
- Fields of Action
- Focus
- Haggle
- I'm the Boss!
- Network
- Patterns II
- Poke
- Sleuth

== Works ==
- Sackson, Sid, Card Games Around the World, ISBN 0-486-27347-4
- Sackson, Sid, A Gamut of Games, ISBN 0-486-28100-0
- Sackson, Sid, Beyond Tic-Tac-Toe, ISBN 0-394-83136-5, Pantheon Books, 1975
- Sackson, Sid, Beyond Solitaire, ISBN 0-394-83304-X, Pantheon Books, 1976
- Sackson, Sid, Beyond Competition, ISBN 0-394-83605-7, Pantheon Books, 1977
