= Fields of Action =

Board game

The initial board setup.

Fields of Action is an abstract strategy board game for two players.

== Description ==
=== Components ===
- any 8x8 board such as a checkers or chess board. Alternating colors of squares do not have any effect on the game.
- 24 checkers or counters, 12 each of two colors, each set numbered 1 to 12

=== Setup ===
The checkers are placed on the board in a specific pattern.

=== Gameplay ===
"Black" moves first, and then play alternates. The active player can move one piece using the following rules:

- A piece can be moved forward, backward or diagonally in one direction a number of squares equal to the number of other counters of both sides that are adjacent to it, as long as it does not end its turn on a friendly counter.
- If a piece has no pieces adjacent to it, it can be moved any number of squares in one direction such that it ends its turn in an empty square that is adjacent to at least two other pieces of either color.

If a piece ends its turn on top of an enemy counter, the enemy counter is removed from play.

=== Victory conditions ===
The game can be won in one of two ways:

- A player captures five counters that are numbered sequentially, such as 5-6-7-8-9. The pieces do not have to be captured in sequential order.
- A player's opponent can make no legal moves.

== Publication history ==
In his 1969 book A Gamut of Games, Sid Sackson described the abstract strategy game Lines of Action (LOA) designed by Claude Soucie. In 1982, LOA and a variation by Sackson titled Field of Action appeared in the German games magazine Spielbox. An English version of Fields of Action was published in the February-March 1989 issue of Games, and also published in R. Wayne Schmittberger's 1992 book New Rules for Classic Games.
