= Roxley =

Roxley (also styled Roxley Games, or Roxley Game Laboratory) is a Canadian game development and publishing firm located in Calgary, Alberta. Their most notable games include Brass:Birmingham, Santorini, Radlands, and the Dice Throne series.

Unlike larger boardgame companies, Roxley uses crowdfunding for each project, typically through the Kickstarter platform. They ran a then-record-breaking Kickstarter campaign for Santorini which raised $700,524 which was surpassed by their later efforts, particularly the 2024 Dice Throne X-Men campaign that raised over $4,000,000.
