= Radlands =

Radlands may refer to:

- Radlands (album), 2012 album by Mystery Jets
- Radlands (game), 2021 board game by Daniel Piechnick
- Radlands (skatepark), skatepark in Northampton, England
