= Breakthrough (board game) =

Abstract strategy board game

Position: a8 black pawn, b8 black pawn, c8 black pawn, d8 black pawn, e8 black pawn, f8 black pawn, g8 black pawn, h8 black pawn, a7 black pawn, b7 black pawn, c7 black pawn, d7 black pawn, e7 black pawn, f7 black pawn, g7 black pawn, h7 black pawn, a2 white pawn, b2 white pawn, c2 white pawn, d2 white pawn, e2 white pawn, f2 white pawn, g2 white pawn, h2 white pawn, a1 white pawn, b1 white pawn, c1 white pawn, d1 white pawn, e1 white pawn, f1 white pawn, g1 white pawn, h1 white pawn

Initial position.

Breakthrough is an abstract strategy board game invented by Dan Troyka in 2000 and made available as a Zillions of Games file (ZRF). It won the 2001 8x8 Game Design Competition, even though the game was originally played on a 7x7 board, as it is trivially extensible to larger board sizes.

== Rules ==
The board is initially set up as shown on the first diagram. To play the game on a different-sized board, just fill the two front and two back rows with pieces; the board does not have to be square.

Choose a player to go first; then play alternates, with each player moving one piece per turn.

Position: b6 black cross, c6 black cross, d6 black cross, c5 white pawn, f3 black pawn, e2 white pawn, f2 white pawn, g2 white pawn

A piece may move one space straight or diagonally forward if the target square is empty. In the second diagram, the white piece on c5 can move into any of the marked squares.

A piece may move into a square containing an opponent's piece if and only if that square is one step diagonally forward. The opponent's piece is removed and the player's piece replaces it. For example, the black piece can capture either the white piece on e2 or the one on g2; it would replace them if it captured. Note that capturing is not compulsory, nor is it "chained" as in checkers; a player can only capture one piece in a turn.

The first player to reach the opponent's home row — the one furthest from the player — is the winner. If all the pieces of a player are captured, that player loses. A draw is impossible because pieces can only move ahead (or be captured), and the piece closest to the opponent's home row always has at least one forward diagonal move available.

== Strategy ==
Although the rules are quite simple (and were the simplest rules in the 2001 8x8 Game Design Competition), the strategy is complex and sophisticated. Generally, an effective offensive strategy is to recognize and attack "pivotal" pieces which are in positions to block multiple routes to victory. An effective defense is to arrange multiple pieces in a blocking pattern (since a single defending piece can not effectively block a single attacking piece).

== Game Solving ==
Smaller variants of the game have been solved:

- 6x6 : first player win
- 6x5 : second player win
- 5x5 : second player win
- 3x7 : second player win
