= Ringo (board game) =

Gernan abstract strategy board game

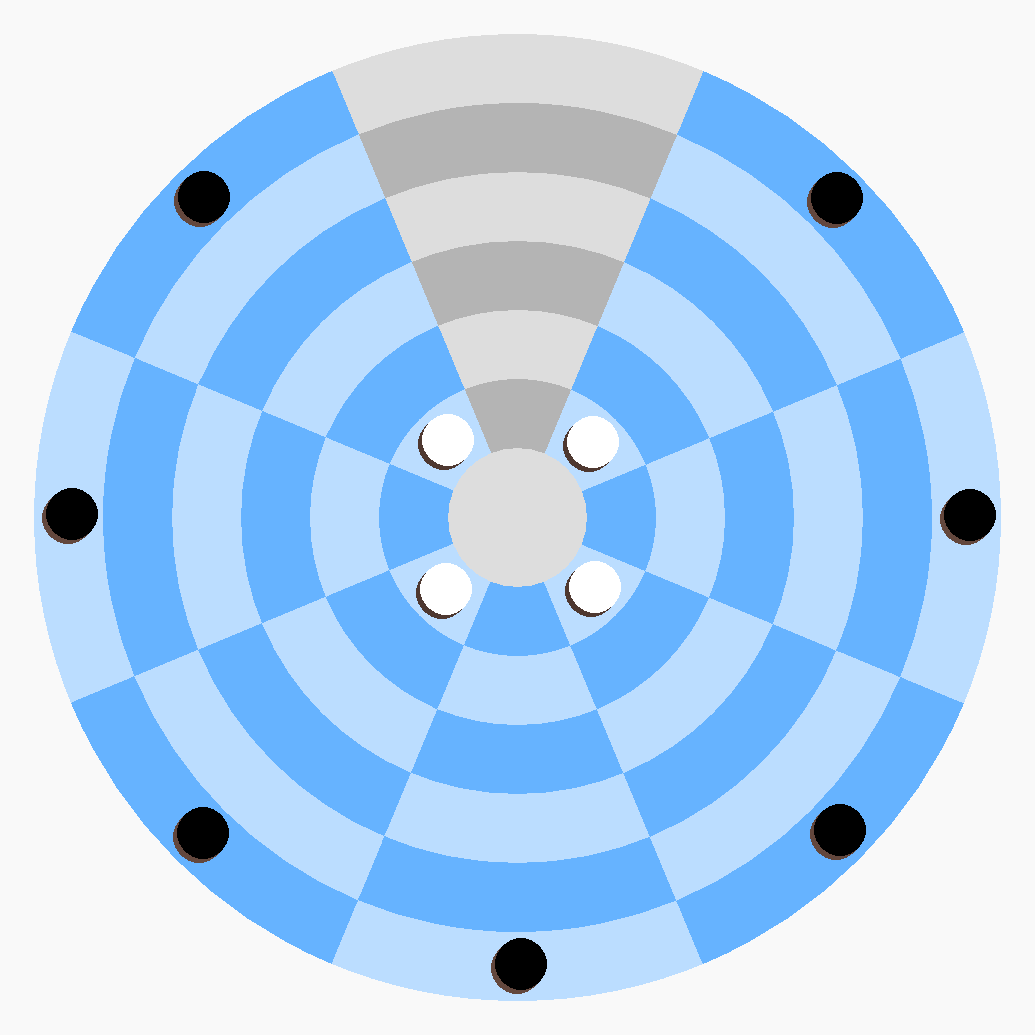
- Ringo board and starting position. Black moves first.
- Years active: late 19th/early 20th century to present
- Genres: Board game; Abstract strategy game
- Players: 2
- Setup time: 30 sec
- Chance: None
- Skills: Strategy, tactics

Ringo is a two-player strategy board game from Germany, invented perhaps in the late 19th or early 20th century. The version of rules described here is from R.C. Bell's Discovering Old Board Games (1973) which is a translation from a German text by M. C. Oswald. The game simulates a siege of a citadel. Attackers are attempting to enter the citadel while defenders are trying to protect it and reduce the number of attackers.

== Overview and setup ==
The circular gameboard consists of six concentric rings divided into eight radial segments, and a central citadel, for a total of 49 spaces of alternating light and dark colors. One radial segment has spaces specially colored to identify it as the neutral zone. The player who is the attacker initially controls seven pieces (black or dark color) that start one per space on the outermost ring (but not in the neutral zone). The player who is the defender initially controls four pieces (white or light color) that start on the four light-colored spaces of the innermost ring (also not in the neutral zone). The attacker wins by occupying the citadel with two of their pieces. The defender wins by capturing six attacker pieces, or by blocking all attacker pieces from moving. (Thus rendering an attacker win impossible.)

Special rules govern piece movement and piece captures.

== Rules ==
- Each space can be occupied by only one piece (except the citadel, when occupied by two attacker pieces at end of game).
- A defender piece may not occupy the citidel.
- Both attacker and defender pieces can enter the neutral zone.
- The number of attacker pieces in the neutral zone cannot exceed the number of remaining defender pieces on the board.
- The attacker player moves first, then turns alternate.

=== Move rules ===
- An attacker piece can move either one step sideways to an adjacent space on its ring, or one step forward (towards the citadel) to the space on the next concentric ring.
- A defender piece can move one step sideways on its ring, or one step either forward or backward to an adjacent concentric ring on a radial segment. In addition, a defender piece can in a single turn move any number of unoccupied spaces along a concentric ring; if the piece enters the neutral zone, however, the turn ends. (The defender piece must wait until a future turn to exit the neutral zone.)

=== Capture rules ===
- Both attacker and defender pieces can capture an opponent piece via a short leap (jumping an opponent piece on an adjacent radial or ring space and finishing on the empty space immediately beyond). For a radial jump to a different ring, attacker pieces can jump only forwards toward the citadel; defender pieces can jump forwards or backwards.
- A defender piece can capture an attacker piece on the same ring via a long leap (jumping over any number of unoccupied spaces to the empty space immediately beyond).
- Both attacker and defender pieces can capture an opponent piece via displacement (finishing a move on top of the opponent piece).
- Capturing is not compulsory.
- Only one piece can be captured in a single turn.
- A captured piece is immediately removed from the game.
- All piece(s) in the neutral zone are immune from capture.
- Both attacker and defender pieces can enter the neutral zone via a capture.
- Neither attacker nor defender pieces can leave the neutral zone via a capture.
- An attacker piece can enter the citadel via a capture.
- A defender piece can capture an attacker piece in the citadel by leaping over the citadel to the empty space immediately opposite.

== Strategy ==
"Black should make use of the neutral zone to organise an assault on the citadel in safety." "White should try to leave one piece on the innermost ring to defend the citadel. He may capture a single black piece in the citadel by jumping over it."

== Simplified rules version ==
Ringo is described in The Way to Play (1975) with simplified rules compared to those described by R.C. Bell. The differences are:

- Captures are performed only by leaps (not displacements).
- A defender piece can move only one space along a ring (not any number of unoccupied spaces).
- A defender piece can capture an adjacent attacker only by a short leap (not a long leap).
- Both attacker and defender pieces can leave the neutral zone via a capture.
