= Murus Gallicus (game) =

Murus Gallicus (Latin for "Gallic Wall") is an abstract strategy game created in 2009 by Phil Leduc. The name "Murus Gallicus" is a reference to the stone walls used in the Gallic wars that took place in Gaul, now modern day France. The game has two win conditions that mimic Julius Caesar's strategy of surrounding the Gauls. The first is breakthrough — reaching the other side of the board — and the second is stalemate — putting the opponent in a position where they cannot make a legal move.

== Rules ==
Murus Gallicus is played on an 8x7 or 8x8 board. One player plays white ("Romans"); the other black ("Gauls"). Initially, each player's first rank is completely filled with towers in their color. The Romans move first.

=== Movement and capture ===
There are two types of pieces in Murus Gallicus: walls (stacks of one stone) and towers (stacks of two). No stack may ever exceed two in height, nor contain pieces of both colors at once.

A wall consists of a single stone, and cannot move or capture. It can, however, block the movement of an enemy tower.

A tower consists of two stones stacked on top of each other. A tower can "move" in any direction (orthogonal or diagonal) in a style similar to mancala: by picking up the whole stack and distributing a single stone to each empty space or allied wall through which the movement passes. When a tower is moved no stones may be left behind, nor is a tower allowed to skip over any empty space or allied wall without leaving behind a stone. Movement may not pass over (or into) an allied tower nor an enemy wall or tower.

If a tower is adjacent (orthogonally or diagonally) to an enemy wall, it may sacrifice one of its own stones (thus becoming a wall) to remove the enemy wall from the board.

=== Victory conditions ===
The player who reaches the other side of the board first, or stalemates their opponent so that they can't make a legal move, wins the game.

== History ==
Murus Gallicus was the result of a long process of improvements on a nameless stacking game that the creator, Phil Leduc, felt was too similar to a different game called Tumbling Down. After playtesting, Leduc limited the stacking limit to two, removed capture, and changed the goal of the game to revolve around stalemating the opponent. With these changes, his nameless stacking game evolved into what Phil Leduc dubbed "Houdini." Houdini was workable but Leduc thought that blockades were a real problem, with players able to simply move back and forth and avoid stalemates. He added a new capture mechanic back into the game that involved sacrificing your own stone and gave birth to Murus Gallicus.

The name came from Leduc's fascination with Latin. While looking through Latin words he came upon the word "murus." This led him to the fortification structures known as muri gallici and through that the Gallic Wars. Murus Gallicus suggested both a name and a theme for the game, upon which he expanded by naming certain tactics after Roman weaponry, such as "the chariot" and "the battering ram."

In September 2009, Murus Gallicus was published virtually as a free-to-play game on iggamecenter.com. It was published physically shortly thereafter by Nestor Games.

In an attempt to receive more attention and reviews on the review site Boardgamegeek.com, Phil Leduc added catapults to the game and created Advanced Murus Gallicus.

== Variants ==
=== Advanced Murus Gallicus ===
Advanced Murus Gallicus adds catapults to the game. Catapults are stones stacked three high. and can block an opponent's movement like walls and towers. They may not move, but can "throw" their third stone two or three spaces away in any direction onto an empty square or enemy-occupied square. Once the stone has been thrown, the stack becomes a tower and functions accordingly.

If a thrown stone lands on an empty square it becomes a wall. If it lands on an enemy-occupied square it reduces the stack present by one: this may reduce a catapult to a tower, reduce a tower to a wall, or destroy a wall.

A tower may sacrifice a single stone, becoming a wall, to reduce an adjacent catapult to a tower. It may also sacrifice itself entirely and reduce an adjacent catapult to a wall.

The movement of towers and the blocking power of walls and towers remains the same as in Murus Gallicus.

== Trivia ==
- Murus Gallicus was featured in the New Abstract Games Magazine for uniquely combining stalemate and breakthrough conditions, which are rarely found in modern abstracts
- Murus Gallicus was featured in David Ploog's list of strategy guides for games that matter.
- Murus Gallicus is featured in Stephen Tavener's AiAi program
- Murus Gallicus is currently published over the board by Nestorgames and online at iggamecenter
- Standard Murus Gallicus has an estimated game tree complexity of 10^101 on an 8x7 board.
