= Agon (game) =

Board game

- Agon board and initial setup. For this diagram, guards are circular pieces, queens are hex-shaped, and the throne is marked with a star.
- Years active: 1842 to present
- Genres: Board game Abstract strategy game
- Players: 2
- Setup time: 30 sec
- Chance: None
- Skills: Strategy, tactics

Agon (or queen's guards or royal guards) is a strategy game invented by Anthony Peacock of London, and first published in 1842. It is a two-player game played on a 6×6×6 hexagonal gameboard, and is notable for being the oldest known board game played on a board of hexagonal cells.

== Rules ==
Each player has one queen and six guards. Players determine who moves first, then turns alternate. On each turn, a player moves one of his pieces. The object of the game is to be first to maneuver one's queen to the central hex (the throne) at the center of the board, and surround her with all six of her guards.

=== Moves ===
The gameboard may be thought of as a series of concentric rings of hex cells (highlighted by rings of alternating colors). Pieces move one step at a time to an adjacent cell, either sideways in the same ring, or towards the throne to the next ring. The cell moved to must be vacant. Only the queen may move to the throne.

=== Captures ===
A piece is captured when two enemy pieces are on adjacent sides of it, in a straight line. The player whose piece is captured must use his next turn to relocate the captured piece:

- If the captured piece is a guard, the owner must move it to any vacant cell of his choosing on the outer board ring.
- If the captured piece is a queen, the owner must move it to any vacant cell on the board.

If more than one piece is captured in a turn, the player whose pieces were captured must move them one turn at a time. If one of the pieces captured was the queen, it must be moved first. If more than one guard was captured, they can be moved in any order.

=== Other rules ===
- If a player surrounds an empty throne with his guards, then neither player will be able to form the winning configuration, and that player forfeits the game.
- It is not allowed to move a piece between and adjacent to two enemy pieces, in a straight line.
- If a player touches one of his pieces he must move that piece, or forfeit his turn.

== Variations ==
- In the original rules, an alternative opening sequence is described: The game starts with only queens, in opposite corners of the board. Players place their guards, one per turn, on any vacant board cells (except the throne). After all twelve guards have been placed, the game proceeds under normal rules.
- A different capture rule for queens is described in The Way to Play: the owner must move his captured queen "to any vacant square that his opponent requires".
- In the Book of Games by Jack Botermans, the rule for capturing states that a player's piece is 'blocked' when between two of their opponent's pieces "in the same ring".
- In a variant used by the Penthalon Institute, called Queens and Guards, a captured piece must move back to an adjacent hexagon within the next outer band.

== Sets ==
In the Victorian era, sets were sold by wood turner Thos Sherwin, and Jaques and Son. Game tables from 18th-century France have been observed with a game board which is almost certainly Agon. It is now thought, however, that the Agon boards were later additions. Versions of Agon are published by Waddingtons Games, House of Marbles and Kruzno.

Eugene Provenzo's Favorite Board Games You Can Make and Play gives detailed plans for making Agon sets.

== See also ==
- List of board games
- Tabletop game
