= Abstract strategy game =

Mental skill based games

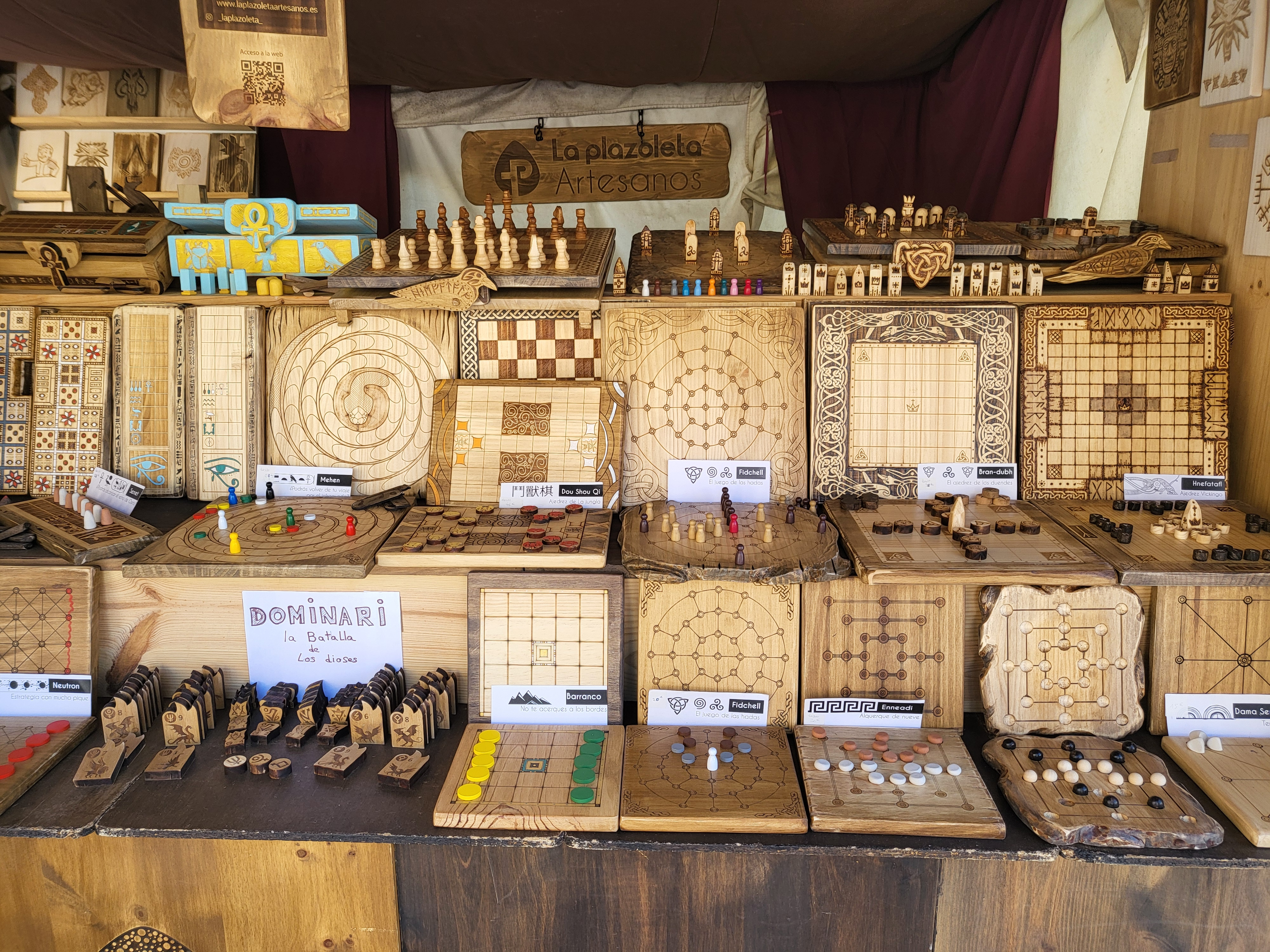
Various historical abstract strategy games on display in Spanish Renaissance fair

Abstract strategy games are games like chess, checkers (draughts), and Go. They are typically strategy games with minimal or no narrative theme, an outcome determined mostly by player choice (with minimal or no randomness; deterministic), and in which there is little to no hidden information (also called perfect information games). Pure abstract strategy games are typically governed by simple, explicit rules whose strategic depth arises from combinatorial complexity. Abstract strategy games are also games of analytical skill, usually with significant depth or strategic complexity. Skill grows over time as players develop experience, and a greater understanding of a specific game. Experienced players with greater ability to analyze multiple moves in advance will almost always beat beginners at abstract strategy games.

There are numerous types of abstract strategy games, from pure strategy to mixed strategy games that may have elements of random or hidden information. Go, Pente and checkers are "pure" abstract perfect information games since they perfectly fulfill all three criteria; chess games, tafl games and Hive feature recognizable themes (though they are highly stylized or minimalistic); Stratego is a borderline or exception case, since it is deterministic, loosely based on Napoleonic warfare, and features some concealed information. Furthermore, some games with elements of chance, like backgammon and pachisi, may also be considered abstract strategy games, though there is disagreement on this issue among ludologists. However, since they contain an element of luck and randomness, they are not "pure" abstract strategy games.

Several traditional abstract strategy games like chess and Go have a long history and are culturally significant products that have been played for generations in various regions of the world. Beyond entertainment, abstract strategy games have served as educational tools to teach logic, patience and foresight. They have also served as status symbols for the intelligentsia and elite classes, and as competitive mind sports. For example, during the Cold War, chess matches were seen as intellectual battles between East and West.

== Definition ==
The first 150 moves of a game of Go

The term abstract refers to a game's formal detachment from representational content and theme, rather than any artistic style or inscrutability. While pieces in abstract games may have conventional names (e.g., "king", "stone", "pawn"), these labels do not imply a simulation of historical, physical, or fictional realities. In cases that the piece design resembles a theme, it is purely for aesthetic reasons, remaining unimportant to game play. A related element of an abstract game is simplicity. Most abstract games have simpler rules and mechanics in comparison to more complicated games like war games and other simulation games. Similarly, even if an abstract game has a theme, it is often simple and minimalistic, and has no necessary logical connection to the game mechanics (unlike most modern Eurogames). Thus, an abstract game's play is centered on spatial and geometric relations, move rules, and logical consequences within a closed system.

The term strategy meanwhile indicates that game outcomes depend primarily on players’ decisions over extended sequences of choices and moves, rather than on reflexes, dexterity, bluffing, guessing, collecting, negotiation, or probabilistic events.

Another aspect of abstract strategy games is that the game elements are all self-contained in the game pieces, parts and rules. Playing the game does not rely on anything external to the game, like physical skill and dexterity, knowledge of language (as in word games), or any other kind of specific knowledge (as in trivia games).

A further trait shared by the majority of abstract strategy games is a spatial or geometric element, often based on a board of tessellated regular polygons; especially a square or triangular lattice.

The formal definition of an "abstract strategy" game is often debated, but several key elements are shared by most games in this family:

- Close to perfect Information: Little to nothing is hidden from all players, and all players can see the entire state of the board, pieces and all other game elements at all times.
- Little to no randomness: There are usually no dice rolls, shuffled decks, or random events. The "input randomness" is close to zero, and the game's complexity arises from the players' moves and position.
- Minimal theme and narrative: While some games have minimal "themes" (e.g., chess represents a stylized medieval court or battle), the mechanics do not rely on this or on any narrative element. The game would function identically if the pieces were replaced with simple geometric shapes.
- Discrete turn structure: Game play proceeds in alternating turns, with clearly defined legal moves.
- Strategic focus: Game play is largely based on spatial reasoning, pattern recognition, and strategic planning.

Many abstract strategy games that closely follow the above principles also happen to be pure strategy games, also known as "combinatorial" games in which there is no hidden information, no random elements, no simultaneous or hidden movement or setup. Many of these are also two-player games where two players or teams take a finite number of alternating turns until a win condition is met. According to Combinatorial Game Theory (2013) by Aaron Siegel, "combinatorial" games have no randomness, no any hidden information, or any simultaneous moves. Winning at these "pure" abstract strategy games relies on pure skill in logic, spatial thinking, and calculation. Furthermore, as Cesco Reale writes, combinatorial or pure abstracts are games in which, "given a game situation and sufficient calculation or reflection time, a player or a fairly powerful calculator can analyze the tree of possible games (up to a defined depth of analysis and with respect to a given evaluation function) and identify the best move (or the set of best moves with equal merit)."

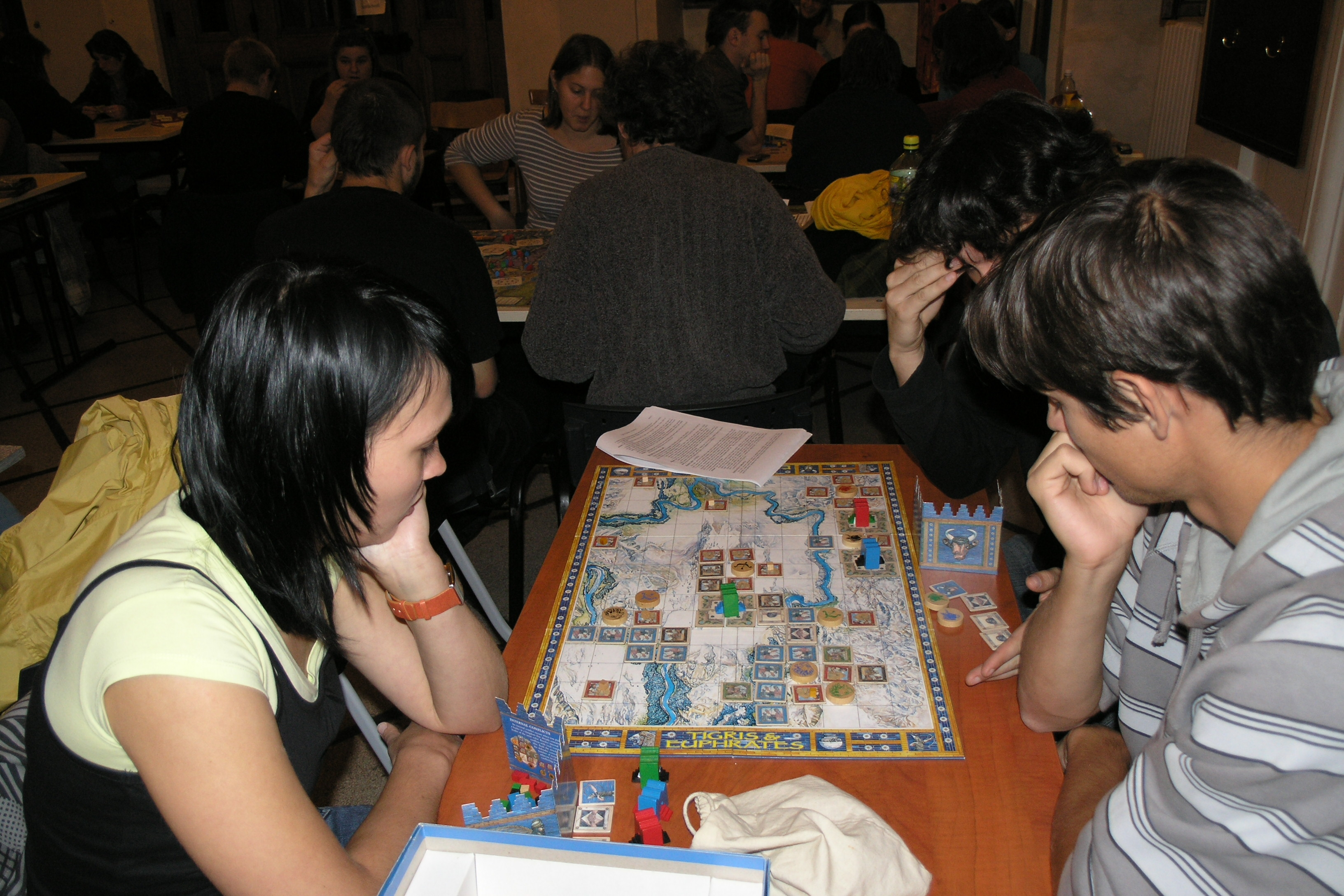
A game of Tigris and Euphrates, a tile laying strategy game with a Mesopotamian theme

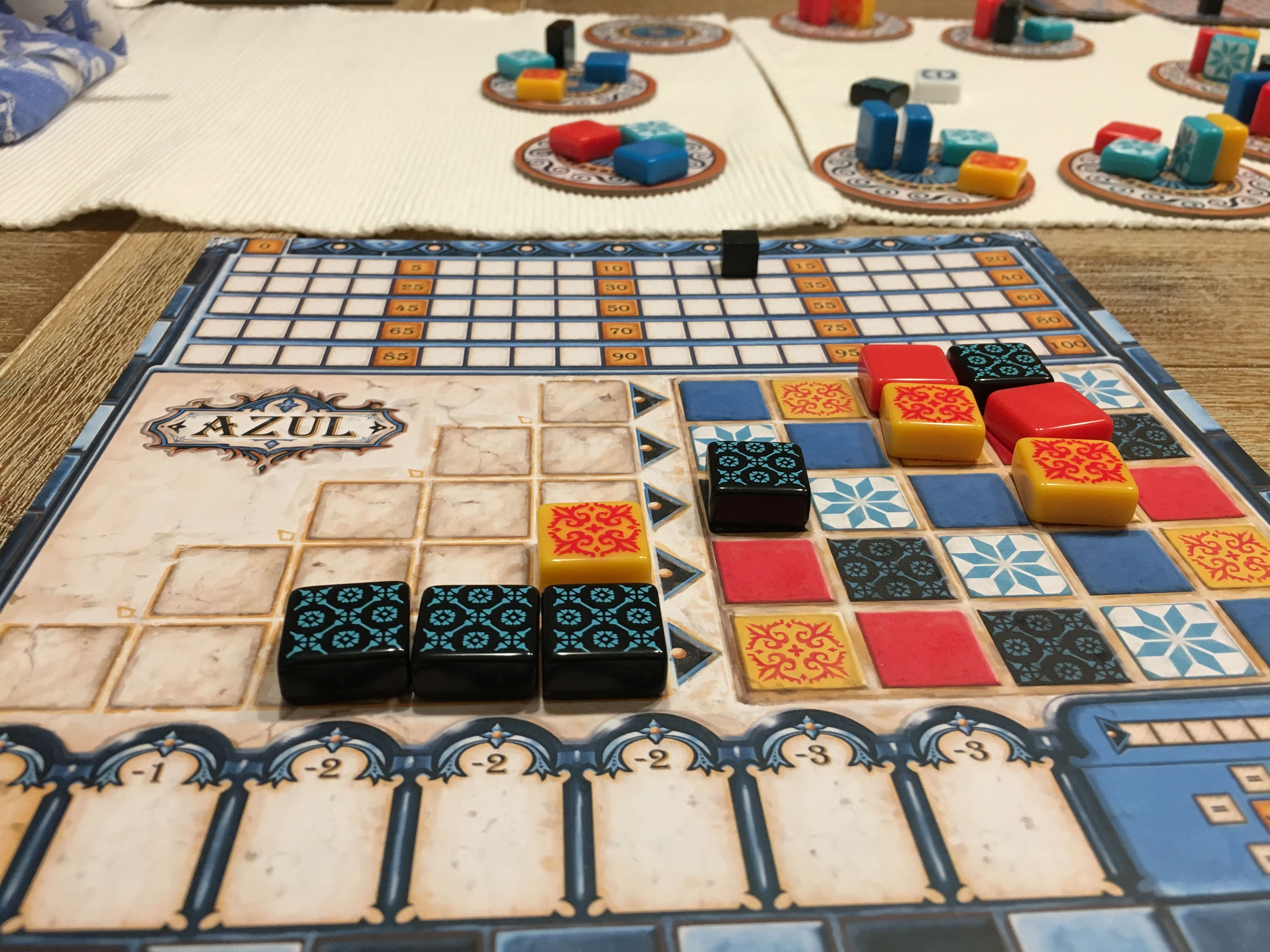
A four-player game of Azul

Nevertheless, some abstract strategy games have thematic elements in their design, such as Tigris and Euphrates, though this is often a non-essential element, and could be replaced with totally different themes without changing the core of the game. Furthermore, some abstract games like Azul do have elements of chance, and these may still classified as abstract strategy games. However, these games are not "pure" strategy, but "mixed" or "hybrid" strategy games. This issue is debated among game designers and ludologists, depending on how strict their definition of "abstract strategy" is, and whether it must be purely combinatorial. Thus, the term abstract strategy game can refer to a superset of pure strategy games which also includes games that do not perfectly fit the definition of combinatorial games but are still very close, since strategic choice remains the most important element. Thus, according to Cesco Reale, this broader definition of abstract strategy includes mixed abstract strategy games like "Backgammon (which has chance), Chinese checkers with more than 2 players (which has possible alliances), 55stones (which has simultaneous moves), or Stratego (which has hidden information)."

According to J. Mark Thompson, abstract play is sometimes said to resemble a series of puzzles the players pose to each other:

There is an intimate relationship between such games and puzzles: every board position presents the player with the puzzle, What is the best move?, which in theory could be solved by logic alone. A good abstract game can therefore be thought of as a "family" of potentially interesting logic puzzles, and the play consists of each player posing such a puzzle to the other. Good players are the ones who find the most difficult puzzles to present to their opponents.

Many games which are abstract in nature historically might have developed from thematic games, such as representation of military tactics. In turn, it is common to see thematic version of such games; for example, chess is considered an abstract game, but many thematic versions, such as Star Wars-themed chess, exist. Nevertheless, the theme is aesthetic and interchangeable, and does not affect actual play.

Traditional abstract strategy games are often treated as a separate game category, hence the term 'abstract games' is often used for competitions that exclude them and can be thought of as referring to modern abstract strategy games. Two examples are the IAGO World Tour (2007–2010) and the Abstract Games World Championship held annually since 2008 as part of the Mind Sports Olympiad.

== Typology ==
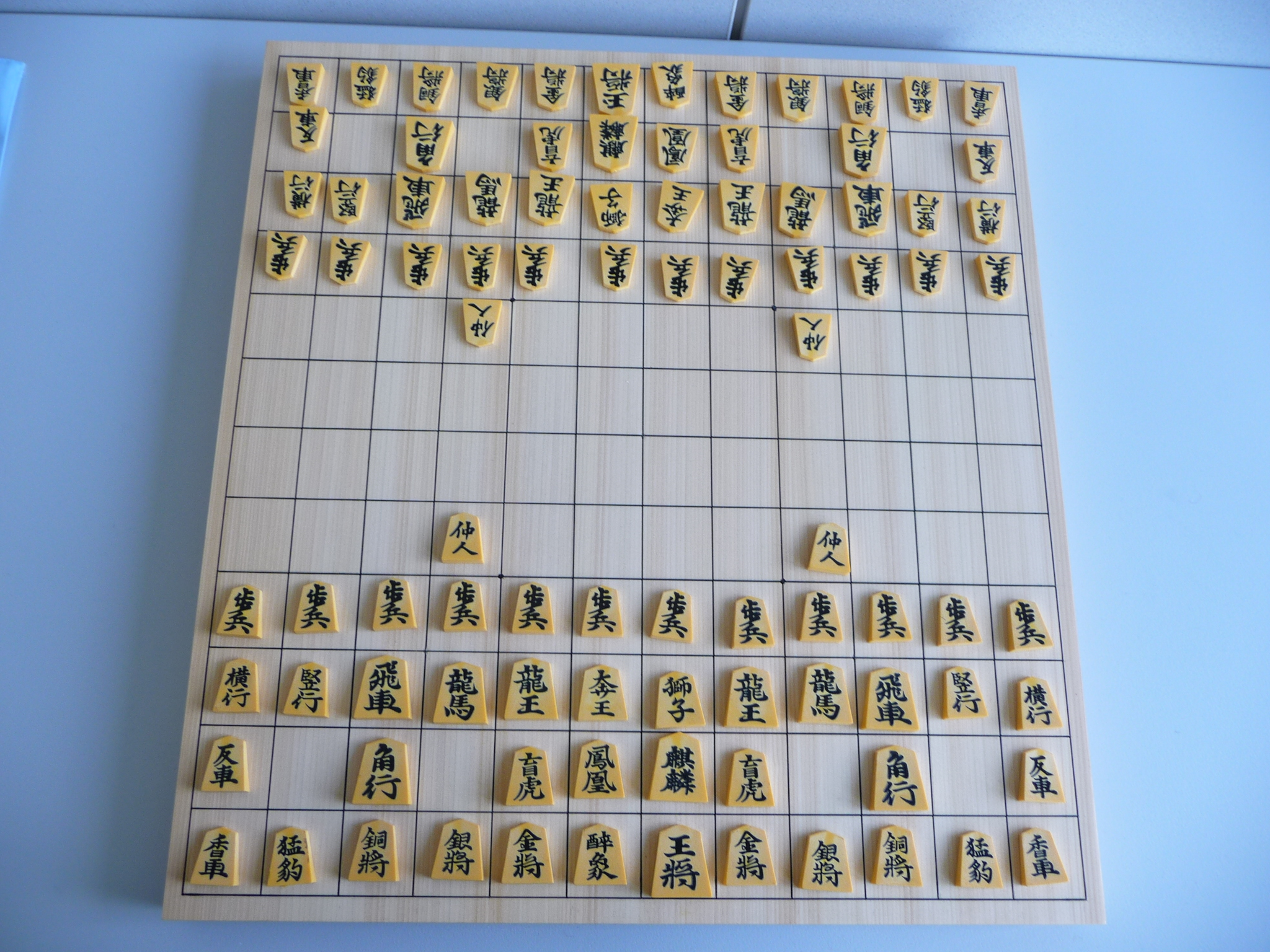
Chu shogi is a traditional Japanese chess-like capture game focused on checkmating the opposing king.

At the core of abstract game typology are pure strategy games like chess and Go, where a player or computer can, in theory, analyze a game "tree" of all possible moves to find an optimal play. These games are deterministic, meaning they have no hidden elements or luck. Within this category, scholars further distinguish between "impartial" games (where available moves depend only on the state of the board, like Nim) and "partisan" games (where players have different pieces or move sets, like chess).

Other critical dimensions of these games include finiteness and information. Games can be finite, cyclic (allowing for repetitions like "ko" in Go), or transfinite. Transfinite games involve infinite states, such as Infinite chess and "Continuous Go" played on a coordinate-free plane, or "TAMSK", which uses time-based movement. Furthermore, one can distinguish between "perfect information" (fully knowing the board state) and "complete information" (knowing the opponents' goals and preferences). Incomplete information arises when a player's motivations or "utility functions" are unknown to others.

If one includes other types of games, the category of abstract strategy may then expand into a broader class of games that are less than pure strategy. This category encompasses games with hidden information, elements of luck (backgammon), or simultaneous moves. Since games of pure chance like snakes and ladders have no strategic elements, they are not abstract strategy games.

=== By level of determination ===
Based on these fundamental distinctions on how game outcome is determined, the following typological classification can be applied to abstract games:

Game Category	Key Characteristics	Examples
Combinatorial	Pure abstract strategy deterministic games, no hidden information, with sequential moves	Chess, Go, Hex, Hive, Nim
Imperfect Information strategy	Abstract strategy games with hidden information elements, but no chance	Stratego, Kriegspiel, Gunjin Shōgi
Chance + Choice	Includes elements of chance but retains perfect information, "impure" strategy games	Backgammon, Azul
Chance + Choice with hidden information	Includes elements of chance and hidden information	Poker
Simultaneous moves	Since players make moves at the same time, all information is not totally available at all times	Morra, 55Stones, or simultaneous chess

=== By objective ===
Apart from the basic binary distinction between pure combinatorial strategy and other types, there are also other ways to classify abstract strategy games. One common approach distinguishes games according to their primary objective, which is often related to the primary game mechanic employed in the game. Harold Murray's A History of Board Games Other Than Chess (1952) analyzed five categories: "race", "war", "hunt", "alignment" / "configuration", and "mancala" games. Robert Bell's Board and Table Games from Many Civilizations (1960) similarly used four categories, "race", "war", "positional", and "mancala" games. Parlett's The Oxford History of Board Games (1999), describes a "classical" categorization of board games which consisted of four primary categories: "race", "space", "chase", and "displace" games.

The following table classifies abstract strategy games by their primary objective or mechanical "win condition":

Category	Description	Examples
Territory Control / Scoring	Players compete to occupy or surround the most space on the board.	Go, Go variants, Blokus, Amazons, Reversi, Sygo, Symple
Capture / Elimination	The goal is to capture opponent pieces or a single special piece (e.g. king).	Chess-like games, Checkers, Shogi, Xiangqi, Hive, Onitama, Epaminondas, Dameo, Alquerque, Surakarta
Count-&-capture	Players use tokens in rows of designated positions to capture their opponent's pieces.	Mancala games, Oware, Sungka, Toguz korgool
Connection	Players must create a line or specific grouping of pieces that make a specific connection.	Hex, TwixT, Pente, Tak, Lines of Action, Trax, Havannah, The game of Y, Onyx
Alignment	Players must position their tokens in an array of a prescribed length.	Tic-tac-toe, Gomoku, Nine men's morris, Connect6, Renju
Configuration	Players must line up their pieces to complete a pre-determined array in a particular order.	Lines of Action; Hexade; Entropy
Race	Racing pieces from a starting position to a goal along a predefined track.	Senet, Chaupar, Backgammon
Traversal / Crossing	Maneuver a piece or pieces to a specific spot (usually across the board).	Agon, Arimaa, Camelot, Breakthrough, Halma, Chinese checkers, Quoridor
Blocking	Block the opponent from being able to make a move.	Mu-torere, Entrapment, Nim, Pentominoes
Asymmetrical, multiple objectives	Games with different objectives, asymmetric goals	Tafl games (Elimination vs. Traversal), Fox games
Cooperative	Games in which players work together towards a common goal	Maze (AG22), Zendo, Penultima

=== Pieces and boards ===
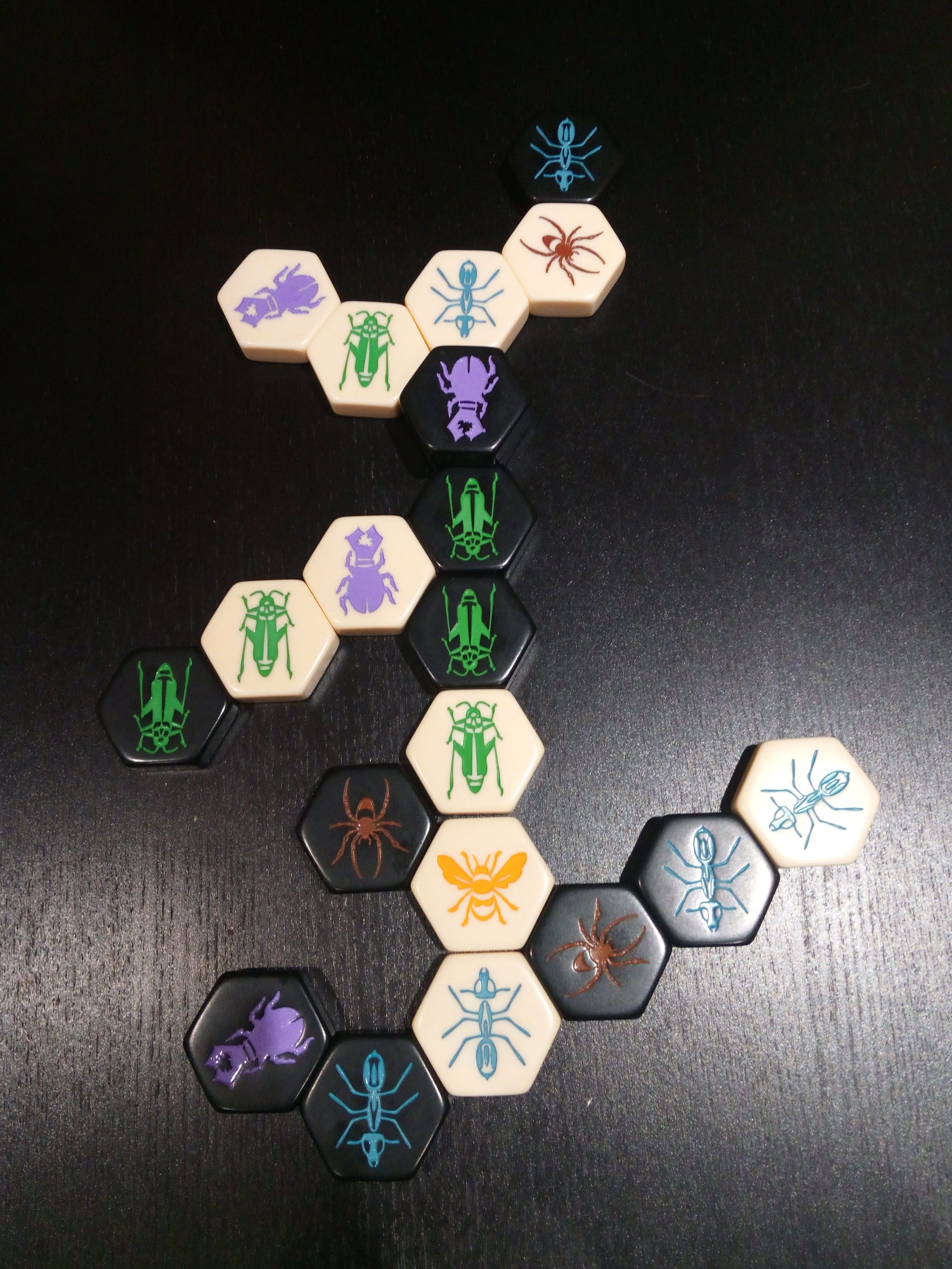
Hive is played with different hexagonal tiles and no board.

In some abstract games, pieces do not move once placed, while in others they may move according to specific rules (which may or may not include the capture of other pieces). Another important axis of classification concerns the nature of game pieces. In some games like chess, pieces possess specific identities and differentiated movement rules, producing a hierarchy of roles and values. In others (like checkers), all pieces are functionally identical, and strategic complexity arises from spatial relations and accumulation rather than from intrinsic piece power. These distinctions have significant implications for how players conceptualize material advantage, exchange, and sacrifice.

In a rarer class of games (Duck chess, Nex, Hobbes), there are one or more neutral pieces apart from the pieces belonging to each player with interact with the other pieces in unique ways (such as blocking them etc).

The rules governing the interaction of the pieces is also another key element differentiating abstract games. For example, capture based games can be based on various means of capture, such as displacement capture (e.g. chess), jumping (checkers), and surrounding a piece, also known as custodial capture (tafl, latrunculi).

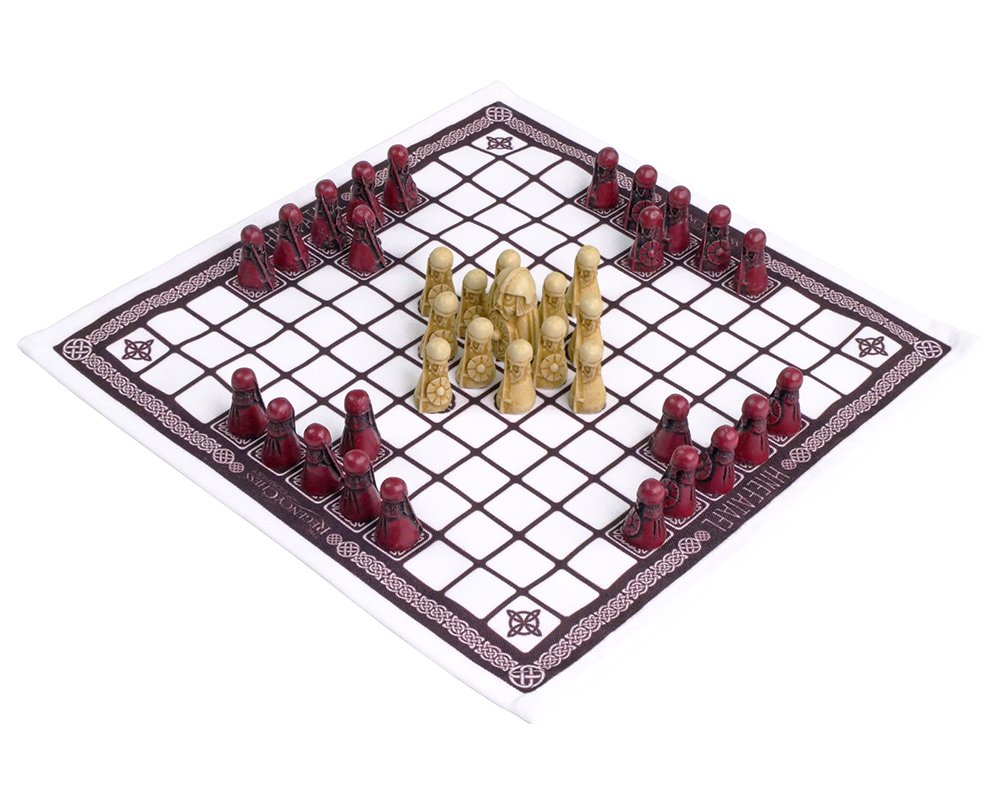
A modern Hnefatafl game, exemplifying a classic asymmetrical setup wherein White has fewer pieces and a king, which must escape to the edge. The Red player meanwhile must capture the white king.

Symmetry is yet another element. While many abstract games begin from perfectly symmetrical positions, others like tafl games or fox games introduce asymmetry in roles, objectives, or initial placement (Horde chess). These kinds of asymmetry lead to strategic dynamics unavailable in symmetric games.

Board structure and design provides a further basis for typology. Many abstract strategy games are played on regular grids that constrain movement orthogonally or diagonally, while others rely on graph-based boards in which movement follows predefined connections between nodes. Grid based boards vary in the basic geometric shape used, with squares (chess), and hexagons (Hex) being the most common. While most are two dimensional, some are 3D, like those in the various types of Three-dimensional chess. In many grid based boards, all grids are the same, but in certain games, some cells or spaces might have unique features or properties that affect play, such as the river and palace in xiangqi. In certain games like Trax and Hive, the effective structure of the "board" emerges through play itself, as the accumulation of pieces transforms the strategic landscape over time.

=== Other considerations ===
While some abstracts like chess and checkers begin with a determined starting position, others like Go and Hive begin with an empty board or field, which is filled placing the game pieces or tiles one by one in each turn. Some abstract strategy games have multiple starting positions of which it is required that one be randomly determined. For a game to be one of skill, a starting position needs to be chosen by impartial means.

Some games, such as Arimaa and DVONN, have the players build the starting position in a separate initial phase which itself conforms strictly to combinatorial game principles. Most players, however, would consider that although one is then starting each game from a different position, the game itself contains no luck element. Indeed, Bobby Fischer promoted randomization of the starting position in chess to increase player dependence on thinking at the board.

Number of players is yet another element. Most abstract games are two players, but there are also numerous games for three, four or more players such as Chaturaji, Chinese checkers, Bughouse chess, and Rengo. These multiplayer abstracts thus introduce game politics, and open up the possibility of the "kingmaker" effect, which happens when one losing player makes a choice that improves the chances of the eventual winner.

== History ==
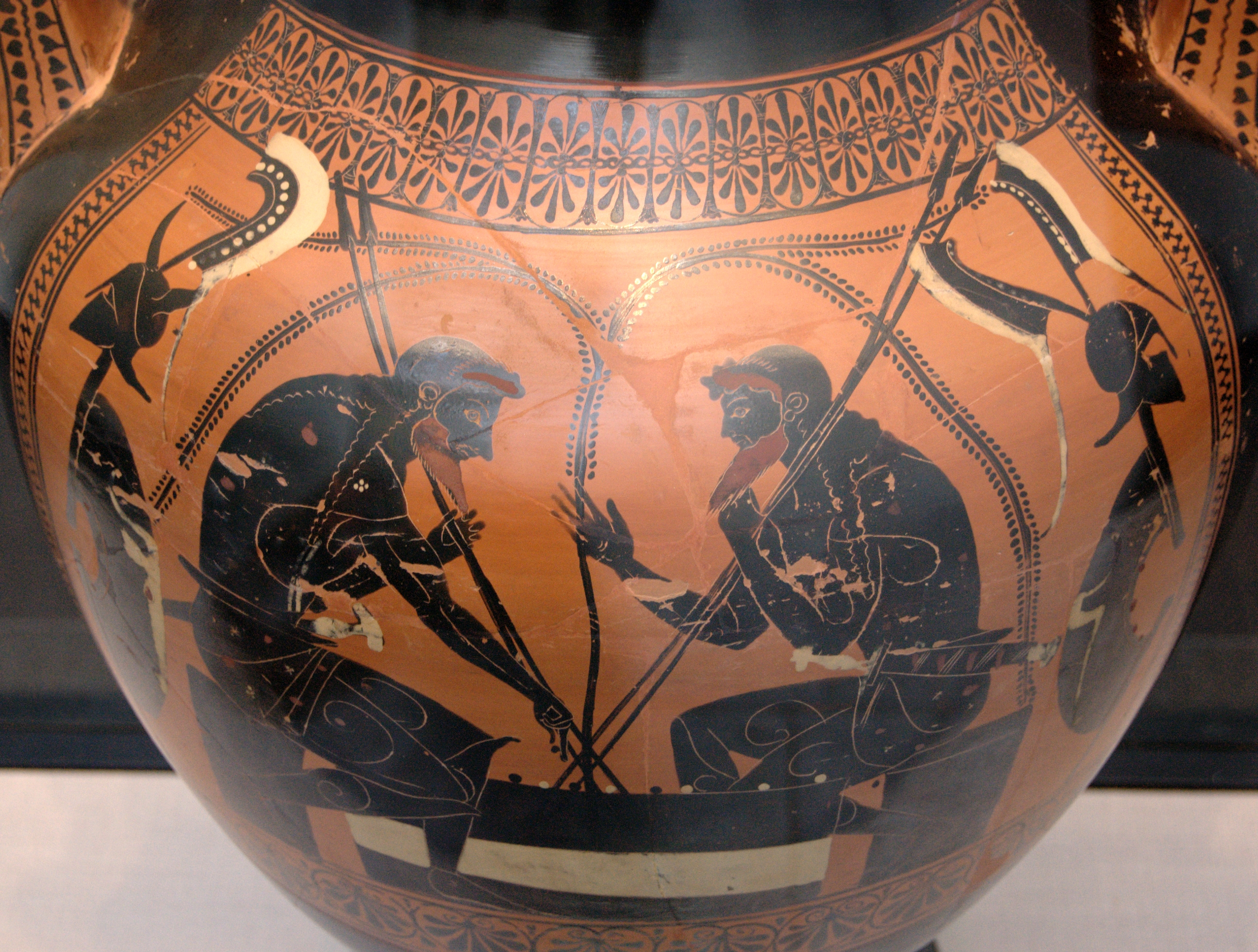
Achilles and Ajax playing a board game

=== Premodern ===
The earliest known board games for which we know the rules were abstract race games. Games like Senet (c. 3100 BCE) and Mehen (c. 3000 BCE) from Ancient Egypt, and the Royal Game of Ur (c. 2600 BCE) contained elements of luck, but they paved the way for later pure strategy games. A board resembling a Draughts board was found in Ur dating from 3000 BC, found by British archaeologist Sir Leonard Woolley in the 1920s. The British Museum contains examples of ancient Egyptian checkerboards, found with their pieces in burial chambers, and boards like these are known to have been used by Queen Hatasu.

Another very ancient family of board games is the Mancala family, which may be as old or older than Senet, though this is disputed by scholars. Mancala variants spread across Africa, the Middle East, and Asia during the medieval period.

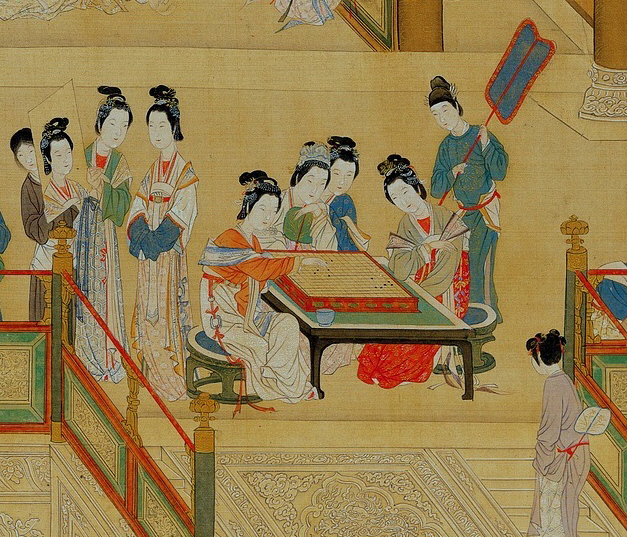
Weiqi at the Ming imperial court, 16th century

Go (Ch: Weiqi), originating in China over 2,500 years ago, remains the oldest pure abstract game still played in a manner close to its original form. It was considered one of the four essential arts of the cultured aristocratic Chinese scholars in antiquity and remains popular today. The earliest written reference to the game is generally recognized as the historical annal Zuo Zhuan (c. 4th century BC).

Many traditional cultures outside Eurasia also developed their own abstract strategy games. Patolli originated in Mesoamerica, and was played by a wide range of pre-Columbian cultures such as the Toltecs and the Aztecs. Kōnane was invented by ancient polynesians in Hawaii and features a capture mechanism similar to checkers.

Before the rise of chess, Mediterranean cultures played a type of capture game similar to checkers. Plato mentions a game called Petteia, as being of Egyptian origin, and Homer also mentions it. Literary sources suggest that petteia games (also called polis) involved capture and blocking, making them conceptual ancestors of later abstract strategy games. A similar type of capture based strategy game was played in the Roman Empire under the name latrunculi or ludus latrunculorum. The exact rules of these types of games are not known, though there have been numerous attempts at reconstruction. These games may have influenced the "tafl" family of games (like hnefatafl or "Viking chess"), popular in Northern Europe, which differed from the Roman games in that tafl games featured asymmetrical gameplay.

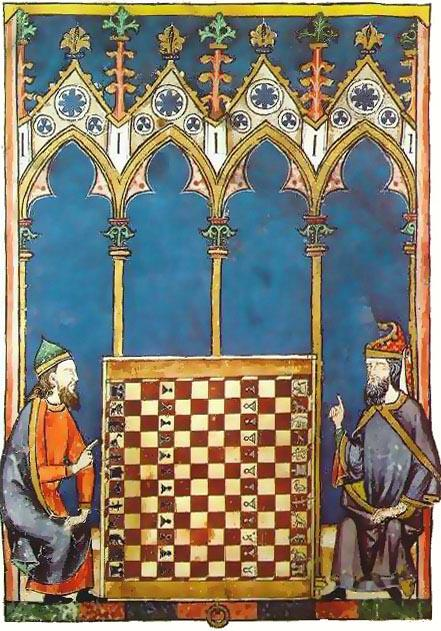
An illustration from the Libro de los Juegos depicting Grant Acedrex, a chess variant played on a 12x12 board

Chess is believed to have originated in northwest India, in the Gupta Empire (c. 280–550), where its early form in the 6th century was known as Chaturaṅga, literally four divisions [of the military] — infantry, cavalry, elephants, and chariotry, represented by the pieces that would evolve into the modern pawn, knight, bishop, and rook, respectively. Chaturaṅga was played on an 8×8 uncheckered board, called ashtāpada, which was also used to play other games like the four player Chaturaji. Modern chess developed in Spain and Italy from the Middle Eastern Shatranj, a medieval descendant of the Indian game. The modern queen was first introduced in Spain during the 15th century, as seen in the Catalan poem Scachs d'amor. Before the rise of modern chess to dominance, many pre-modern chess variants also existed, like Courier chess, Grant Acedrex, Short assize, and Great chess.

Outside of the Mediterranean world and Europe, numerous regional chess-like games also developed from the Indian or the Middle Eastern versions of game. They include xiangqi (China), shatar (Mongolia), makruk (Thailand) and sittuyin (Burma). Shogi (Japan) was the earliest chess type game to allow captured pieces to be returned to the board by the capturing player. This drop rule is speculated to have been invented in the 15th century, possibly connected to the practice of mercenaries switching loyalties when captured.

==== Timeline ====
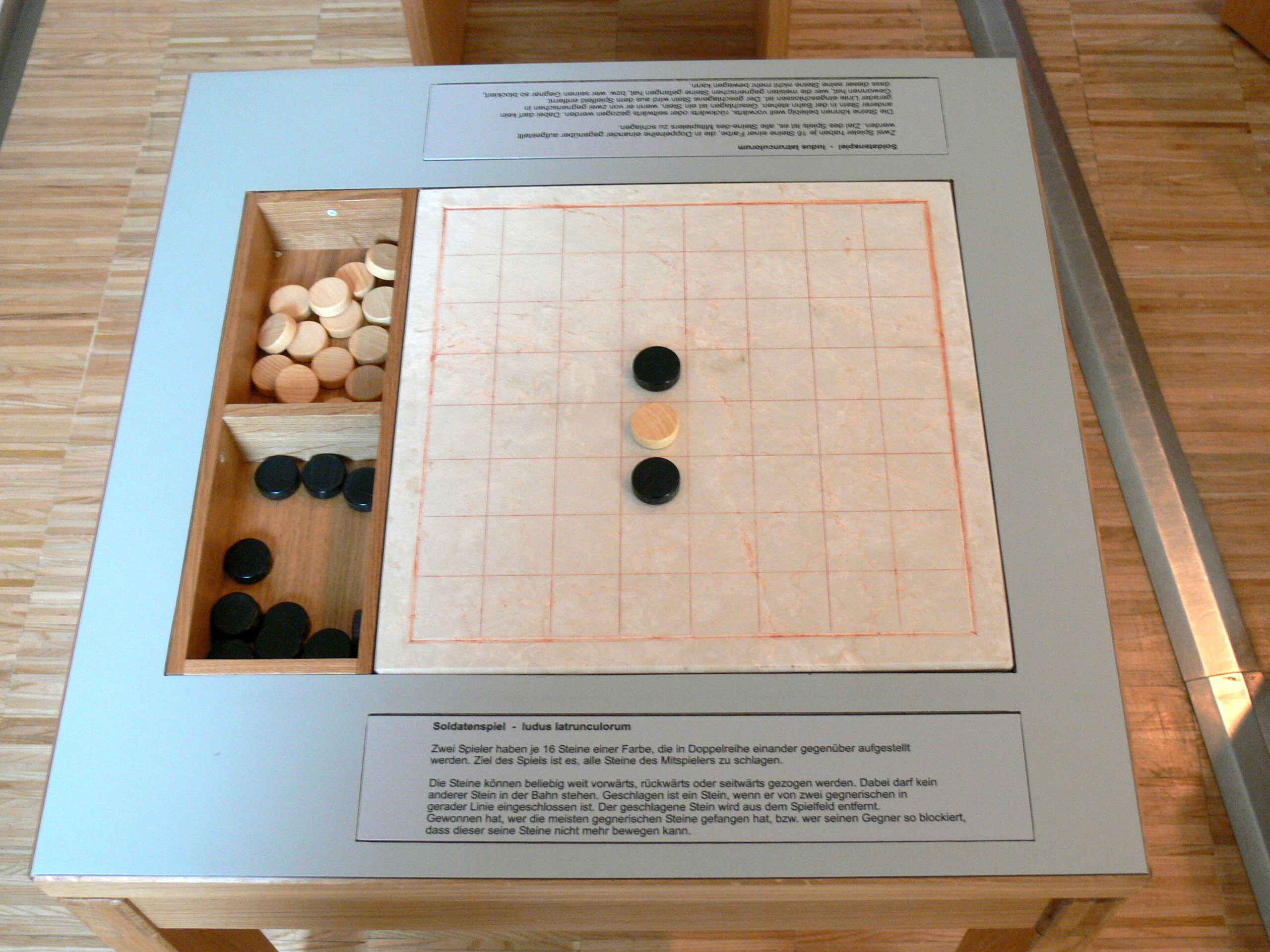
Modern reconstruction of Ludus latrunculorum

The following is a timeline of key pre-modern abstract strategy games:

- Mehen (c. –3500)
- Senet (c. –3000): An Egyptian race-and-transition game played on a 3×10 board which acquired funerary and religious symbolism over time.
- Royal Game of Ur (c. –2600): A Mesopotamian race game
- Proto–XII Scripta (c. –2500): A hypothesized early ancestor of later Roman tables games, inferred from archaeological material at Jiroft.
- "Five Lines" (ε γραμμαί) (c. –650): A Greek linear board game known from literary references
- Petteía (c. –450): A Greek abstract strategy game emphasizing positional play and capture; likely involved unequal objectives or zones of control.
- Liubo (c. –400): An early Chinese board game known from tomb finds and texts; rules are lost
- Aṣṭāpada (c. –300): An 8×8 grid board used for multiple games
- Weiqi / Go (c. –300): A fully abstract strategy game centered on territory and influence rather than piece capture; represents an independent East Asian strategic tradition.
- Tabula (c. –150): A Roman successor to XII scripta; a direct ancestor of later backgammon-type games.
- Nine men's morris (c. –100): Simple alignment games known in the Roman world
- Latrunculi (c. –100): A Roman capture-based war game with no chance elements
- Proto-Patolli (k’uillichi) (c. +400): Mesoamerican race game; structurally comparable to Old World track games.
- Boluosai Xi (c. +400): A Chinese war-themed board game; poorly attested but suggestive of early strategic abstraction.
- Shuangliu (c. +500): A Chinese race-and-track game that later influenced Japanese sugoroku.
- Caturaṅga (c. +500): The earliest form of chess; introduced differentiated piece movement and formalized symmetrical war simulation.
- One-cycle Mancala (Aksum) (c. +550): An early African pit-and-stone game; emphasizes counting, redistribution, and resource exhaustion.
- Nard (c. +600): A Persian tables game which is a direct ancestor of backgammon.
- Hnefatafl (c. +700): A Scandinavian asymmetrical war game with unequal forces and objectives; one of the earliest known asymmetrical abstract strategies.
- Fidchell (c. +750): Insular Celtic strategy games described in literature; possibly related to latrunculi in structure.
- Shengguan Tu (c. +800): A Chinese promotion game tied to bureaucratic advancement metaphors
- Xiangqi (c. +800): Chinese chess
- Mig-gmag (c. +800): Tibetan abstract board games emphasizing movement and capture
- Tafl games (c. +900): Includes asymmetrical victory conditions
- Rythmomachia (c. 1000): A medieval European mathematical strategy game based on numerical ratios and capture conditions.
- Chess (regional traditions) (c. 1000): Consolidation of chess traditions across Europe, Japan (shogi), China (xiangqi), and Southeast Asia (chatrang variants).
- Tiger Games / Baghchal (c. 1100): South Asian hunt games; emphasize asymmetric movement, capture, and spatial confinement.

=== Modern developments ===
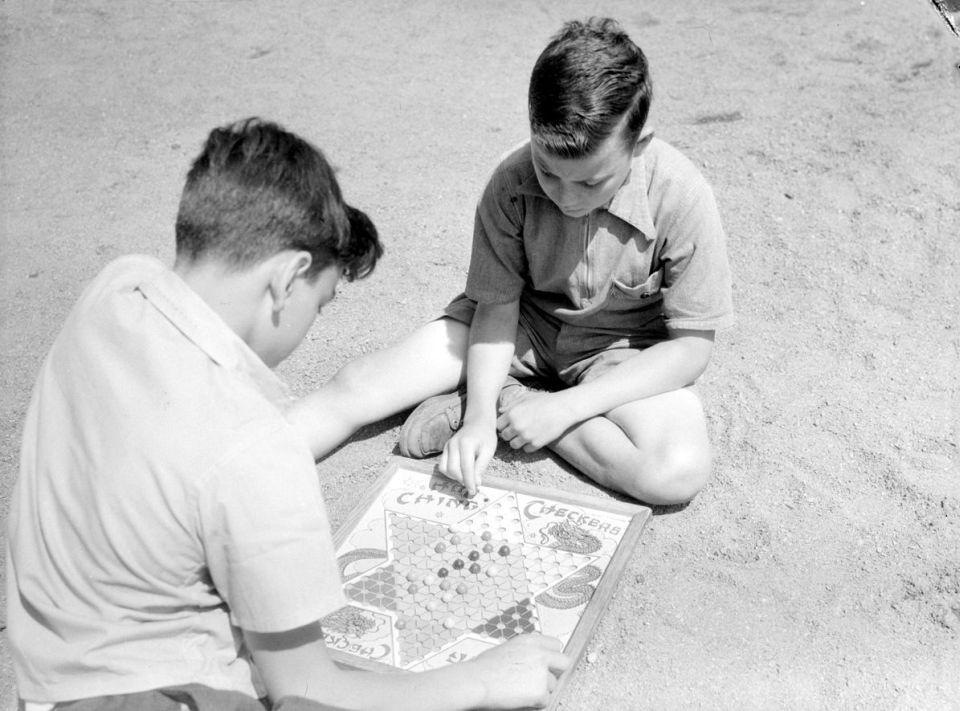
Children playing a commercial version of Chinese checkers

The modern era saw the leveraging of new technology to make board games, including printing presses, plastics and mass production. This allowed for a greater availability of different game sets, making them more accessible to people from various social classes who had more disposable income to spend on leisure activities. Modern abstract games often use innovative materials (like Bakelite or 3D-printed plastic) and focus on elegant, minimalist rule sets that produce deep complexity.

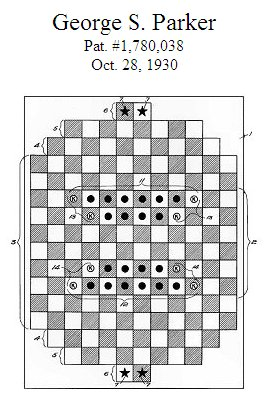
Camelot patent drawing, 1930

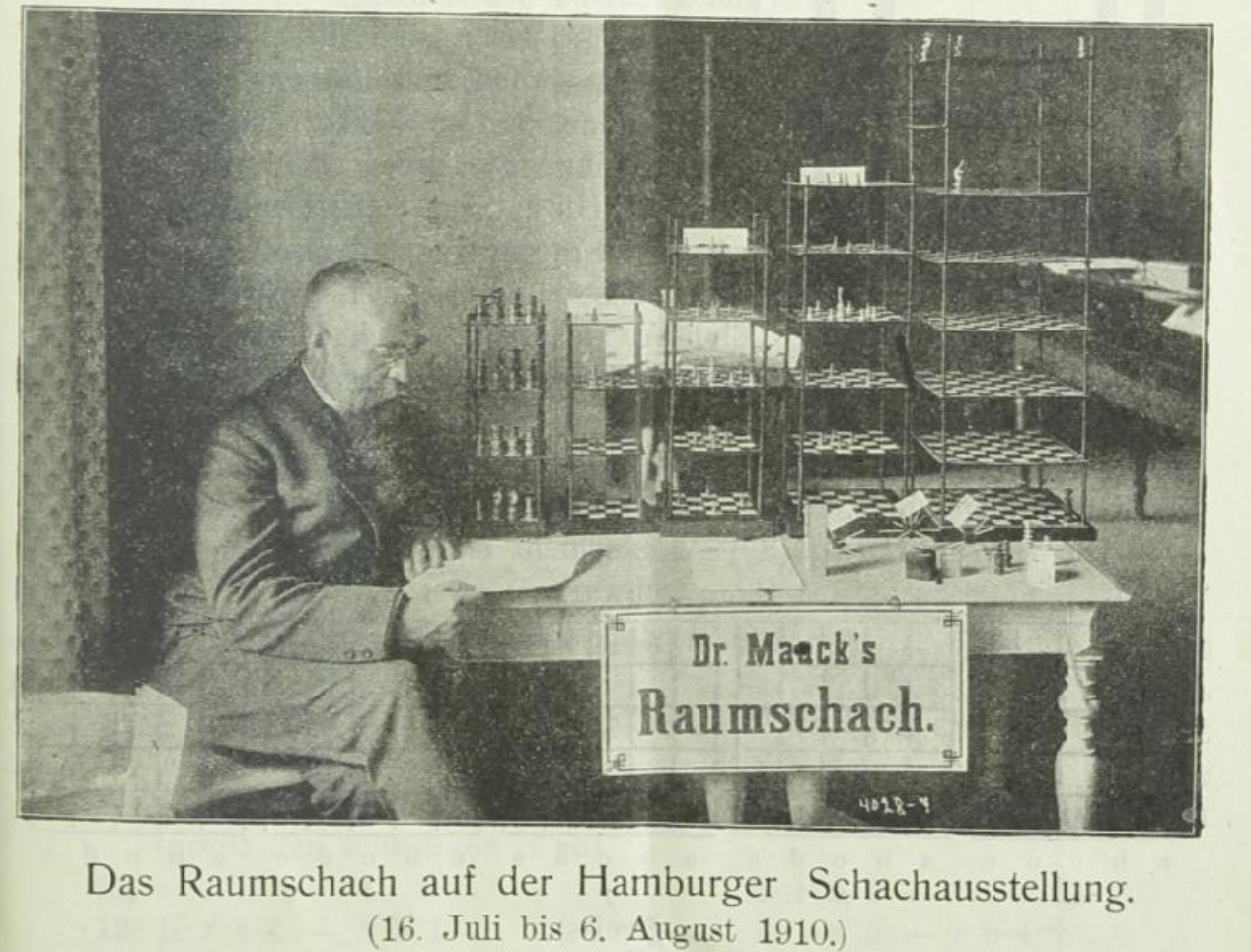
Ferdinand Maack demonstrating his various Raumschach variants at the Hamburg Chess Exhibition

The 19th and 20th centuries saw an increase in new games with unique and creative mechanics. The modern era also saw the emergence of influential game designers, and the development of vibrant communities of serious gamers and ludologists who study games from different perspectives, from the practical elements to mathematical game theory. The roots of modern abstract game design can be traced to the early nineteenth century, when designers began systematically exploring new spatial and mechanical concepts. In 1842, Agon emerged as the first known game to use hexagonal cells, featuring a racing format with a common goal zone shared by both players.

The latter half of the century proved particularly fertile. Reversi (and its variant Othello) appeared in 1883, introducing a unique toggle capture mechanism that would later influence numerous designs. This game achieved remarkable longevity, remaining actively played through its 1971 reincarnation as Othello, demonstrating that certain innovative mechanics could transcend their era. Around the same time, Bashni emerged in 1885 as the progenitor of column checkers games. The 1880s and 90s also saw various new crossing games like Halma, Salta (1899) and Chinese checkers, though earlier games of this type did exist, like Ugolki. Chinese Checkers (originally designed as Sternhalma in Germany) notably achieved folk status, becoming one of the rare designer games to achieve widespread adoption after its publication by the Pressman company.

George S. Parker was an influential game designer of the turn of the century, known for founding the early game company Parker Brothers. His innovative abstract game Camelot (originally called Chivalry) was an early crossing game requiring players to move two pieces into a goal zone.

The period between 1895 and 1900 saw the creation of several games that would later prove significant, including Dots and boxes in 1895. The turn of the century brought Raumschach in 1907, an early exploration of three-dimensional chess that demonstrated designers' willingness to challenge fundamental spatial assumptions.

=== 20th century ===
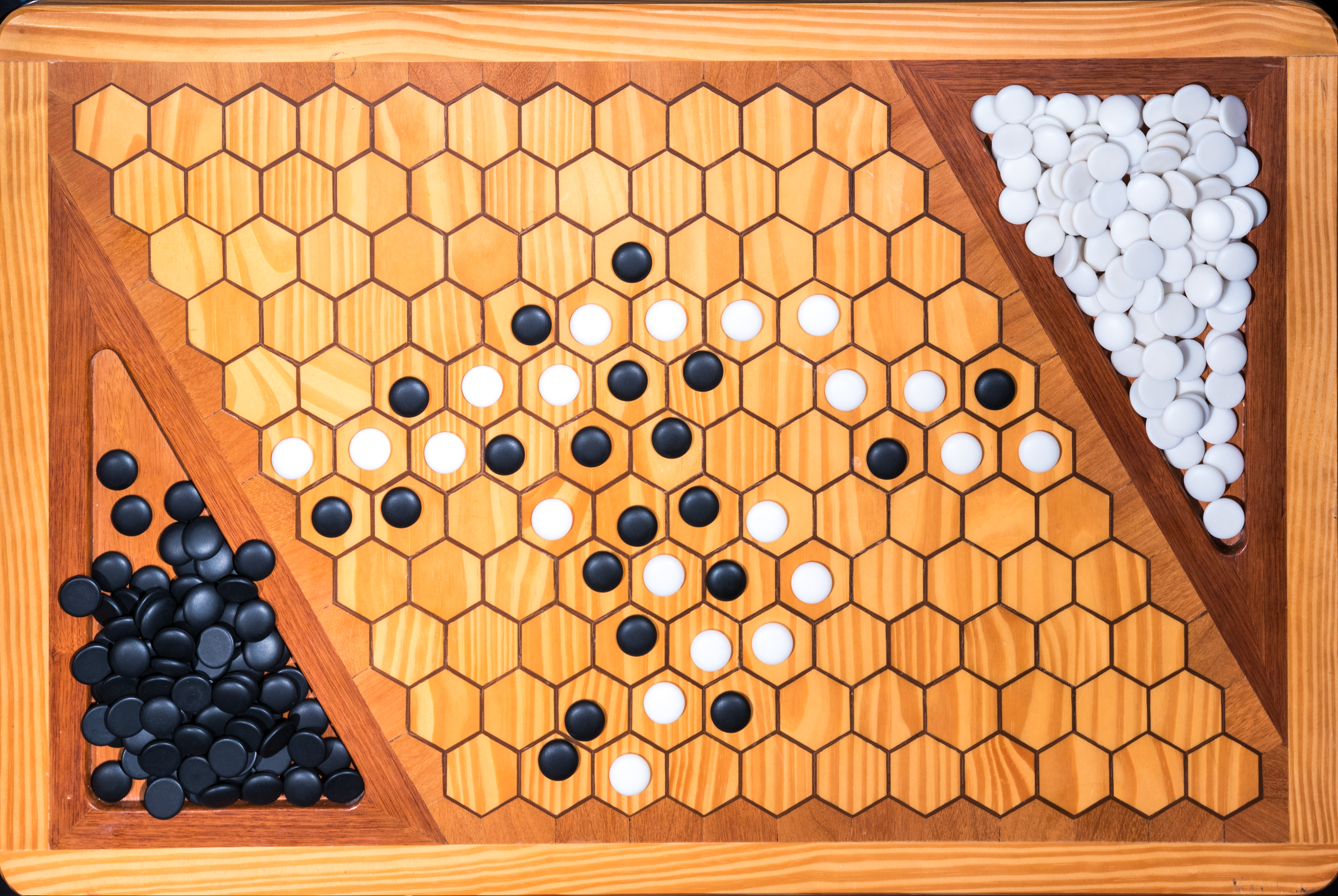
The end of a game of Hex on a standard 11×11 board. Here, White wins the game by connecting the left and right sides of the board.

The 20th century saw an explosion in the creation of new and innovative abstract strategy games along with the development of combinatorial game theory and game design theory. The first half of the century witnessed continued experimentation with spatial arrangements and rule modifications. Emanuel Lasker's Lasca appeared in 1911, followed by Ringo in 1915. The 1920s introduced Marseillais chess, also known as Double Move Chess, which began exploring multi-action turn protocols that would later become significant design tools. Meanwhile, Stavropol Checkers introduced the mutator concept of using pieces of either color. The period also saw important developments in traditional abstract games, with the Japanese gomoku variant Renju beginning its evolution as a living ruleset in 1899. The use of komi as a balancing mechanism in Go, first documented in 1852 and employed in tournament play by 1907, illustrates how mathematical approaches to game balance were gaining recognition.

The 1940s proved pivotal with the creation of Hex in 1942 by mathematician Piet Hein. Popularized by John Nash, Hex kickstarted the hexagonal connection genre and would become one of the most influential games in modern abstract design history. 1942 also saw the development of Teeko, notable for incorporating dual win conditions wherein players could win by forming either four-in-a-row or a two-by-two square. This game achieved significant commercial success initially, though it ultimately faded from play despite multiple revisions by its creator, the magician John Scarne, illustrating that marketing and publicity cannot guarantee long-term success without sufficient depth of play.

The 1950s and 1960s saw an explosion of new abstracts, and the era marked a crucial transition as game design began to develop more sophisticated theoretical underpinnings. Alice chess appeared in 1953, while TwixT emerged in 1957 as perhaps the first successful square connection game. Significantly, Twixt's designer Alex Randolph insisted that his name appear on the box, representing an early assertion of designer identity in an industry where creators often remained anonymous. Sid Sackson emerged as a particularly influential figure during this era. His 1964 game Focus introduced stack movement equal to stack height, a mechanic that would inspire future designs. Focus would go on to win the Spiel des Jahres in 1981, marking rare mainstream recognition for a pure abstract game. Sid Sackson's 1969 book A Gamut of Games proved very influential, exposing a generation of players and designers to innovative abstract games and helping establish a vocabulary for discussing game mechanics and design principles. Lines of Action appeared in 1969. It introduced the unification or dynamic connection genre through elegant rules and a strong aversion to draws and cycles, though its core mechanics were essentially non-finite with additional rules ensuring termination. Further games like Sprouts, and Feudal explored diverse mechanical spaces. The Game of Y (circa 1960) also offered an important variant of Hex that eliminated special edge markings.

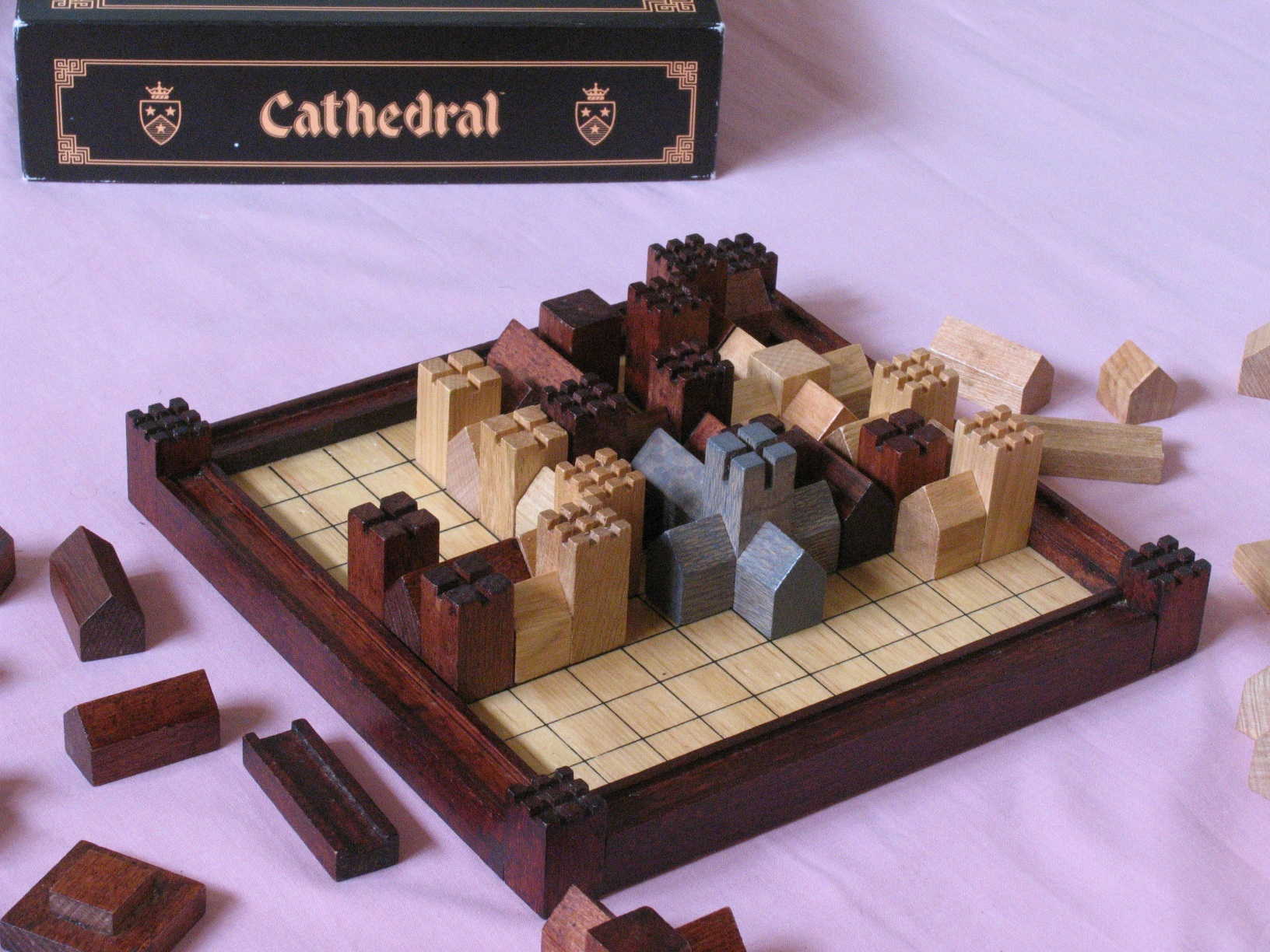
Cathedral game in progress

The 1970s saw continued mechanical innovation alongside growing commercial interest. Connect Four (1975) became a popular commercial game, known for its unique vertical design that was accessible to casual players. Cathedral (1978), was another new game with unique pieces and mechanics. Robert Abbott wrote an influential article promoting his game Epaminondas (1975), titled Under the Strategy Tree, which introduced his concept of "clarity" as it pertains to game design in abstract strategy games. The late 1970s also witnessed experiments with non-traditional boards, including Kensington (1979), which became perhaps the first combinatorial abstract game on an Archimedean board. Furthermore, multi-action turn protocols now bean to appear in games like Conquest (1974), Guerilla (1976), and Phalanx (1980). These games showed how multiple sequential actions within a single turn could lead to further strategic depth.

1980's Trax introduced the loop goal, later used in Havannah (1981), creating an alternative win condition that would inspire subsequent designs. Abalone appeared in 1987, achieving commercial success through high production values and intensive marketing despite balance issues in its original setup that players addressed through alternative configurations. Amazons developed in 1988 as an emergent territorial game featuring a board-shrinking dual-move mechanic that created a high branching factor of possible game states.

The work of mathematician John Conway significantly contributed to the development of combinatorial game theory, which he developed while studying Go, providing mathematical tools and terminology that would influence how designers and players discussed abstract games. The publication of Winning Ways for Your Mathematical Plays (1982, Berlekamp, Conway and Guy) provided rigorous mathematical analysis of combinatorial games, further developing the theoretical foundations of the field. R. Wayne Schmittberger contributed significantly through his game designs and his 1992 book New Rules for Classic Games. Schmittberger's Maxi-Star appears to be the first combinatorial game employing recursive scoring, a mechanism where the largest group determines the winner, with ties broken by the second-largest group, then the third, and so on. This scoring approach would later be popularized by Reiner Knizia in games like Tigris and Euphrates (1997) and Ingenious (2004), eventually proving influential in modern abstract design.

=== The information age and the 21st century ===
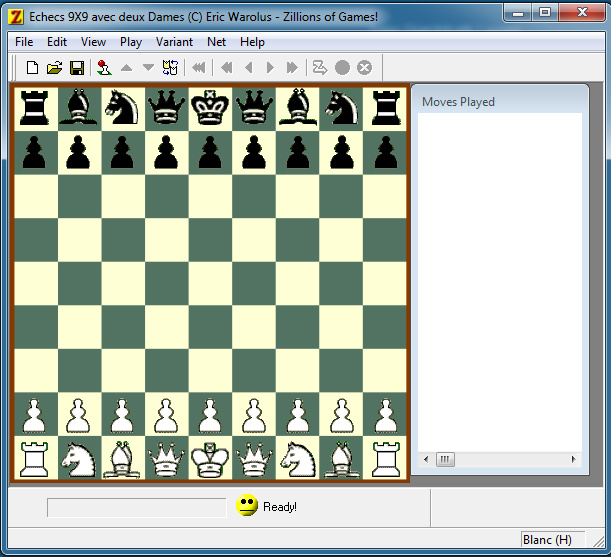
A chess variant played on the Zillions of Games software

The late 20th century digital revolution saw the rise in the use of computers to analyze abstract games and to play them with other humans over the internet, or against bots of various strengths. Thus, video games themed around abstract strategy games such as chess or checkers became widespread by the end of the century. The founding of the Computer Olympiad in 1989 established competitive computerized game-playing as a recognized pursuit, while Deep Blue's defeat of Garry Kasparov in 1996 demonstrated that artificial intelligence had reached world-championship level in chess, raising questions about the relationship between human and computer capabilities that would influence game design for decades.

The internet's popularization in the 1990s proved momentous, enabling geographically dispersed individuals interested in abstract games to connect and exchange ideas. The rec.games.abstract discussion group, with earliest evidence dating to 1992, became an important venue for design discussion and community formation. Several designers credited this internet forum as pivotal to their development. Websites like ChessVariants (1995), and Gamerz.net (1996) provided platforms for sharing and playing many rare abstract games.

The Zillions of Games software (1998) represented a breakthrough in making abstract games accessible. This software, along with later platforms like Ludi (2006–2009), Ludii (2016–present), and the Java-based AiAi (2015–present) allowed players to try games they did not physically own, while allowing game designers to distribute their creations widely. These tools fundamentally democratized abstract game design and play. The 1990s also saw the abstract Ataxx in 1990 gaining fame as an arcade video game, representing perhaps the first case of contagious toggle capture where pieces could convert adjacent enemy pieces. Platforms for online play proliferated during the 2000s. Little Golem, founded in 2000, provided correspondence play. Boardspace.net (founded 2006), Iggamecenter (founded 2007), and others offered both real-time and correspondence options. Super Duper Games (founded 2005) became another important repository.

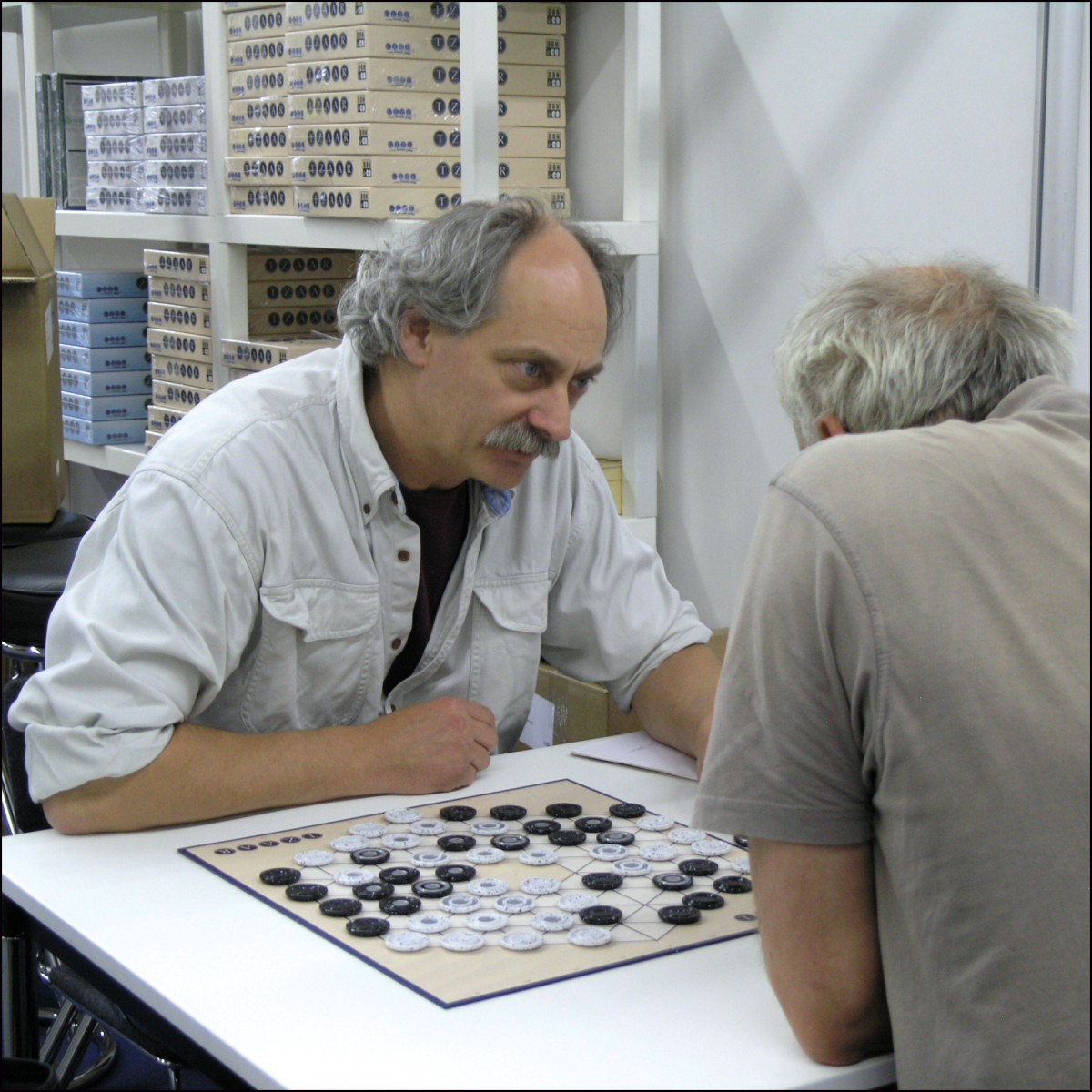
Game designer Kris Burm playing TZAAR at the Essen Game Fair (Spiel), 2007

The early 2000s marked a watershed as abstract game design achieved greater professionalization. Publishers specifically focused on abstract games emerged, including Gigamic (founded 1991, Quarto and Pylos), Clemens Gerhards (begins publishing in 2000), Steffen-Spiele (founded 2003), and Nestorgames (2009). Stephen Tavener's single-handed publication efforts also led to an extensive catalogue of new designs. Kris Burm's "GIPF Series" of games, beginning with GIPF in 1996 and continuing through ZERTZ (1999), DVONN (2001), and TZAAR (2007), had significant impact on design thinking during the 90s and 2000s. These games featured high-quality components and innovative mechanics, with DVONN and TZAAR winning game of the year awards. From 1998 to 2009, abstract games like Quoridor, DVONN, and TZAAR won Games Magazine's overall Game of the Year award, achieving mainstream recognition.

Abstract Game Magazine began publication in 2000, running until 2003 before resuming in 2020, providing a venue for serious discussion of design principles and game analysis. Mark Thompson's "Defining the Abstract" article published in 2000 contributed to ongoing discussions about what constituted an "abstract strategy game". Cameron Browne also emerged as a major figure through his 2005 book Connection Games, which provided comprehensive coverage of this important genre, and his publication of the first Hex strategy book. His 2008 dissertation on automatic generation and evaluation of recombination games led to Yavalath, a novel game designed by computer using evolutionary algorithms, demonstrating that algorithmic approaches could produce genuinely enjoyable games. Further academic studies, like Frank Lantz's 2017 Depth in Strategic Games (2017), have provided analytical tools for evaluating a strategy game's strategic depth.

From approximately 2000 to 2010, a game's resistance to AI and computer domination became a frequent discussion topic and design goal. Designers thus sought to create games that would stymie artificial intelligence, with designers of games like Octi, Arimaa (2002), and Havannah offering significant monetary rewards for AI that could defeat top humans. This trend drove designers to look for game mechanics that proved challenging to AI like multimove turns (Arimaa). Arimaa notably sustained itself through an online community, demonstrating how internet communities could keep games alive. However, the "AI resistance" trend died out as Monte Carlo methods developed and neural network approaches emerged, which allowed AIs to learn and dominate in almost any game with proper training. AlphaGo's success against Lee Sedol in 2016 marked a turning point in this trend of game design. AlphaZero, published in Science in 2018 as a general game-playing algorithm, and projects like Leela Zero (2017) demonstrated that AI had achieved dominance across multiple games. Meta's Polygames mastered Hex and Havannah in 2019, while Galvanize Zero mastered numerous games including chess, Connect6, various Hex board sizes, Reversi, Amazons, Breakthrough, and international draughts. Despite AI's dominance, the AI resistance movement had a lasting impact on abstract game design. It prompted designers to think systematically about human perceptual faculties and their relationship to games, contributing to deeper understanding of strategic depth. This influenced numerous subsequent designs even after the original motivation to resist AI dominance had disappeared.

Many innovations in game mechanics were also introduced during the 90s and 2000s. For example, the 12* balance protocol, where the first player makes one move and subsequently each player makes two moves, gained prominence through Connect6 (2003). The protocol had earlier appeared in Marseilles Chess variants, with the 12* notation being formally incorporated in 1963. Recursive scoring emerged as another powerful tool. Knizia's implementation of it in Ingenious (where scores are determined by the player's weakest color, creating tension around balanced development) demonstrated how recursive scoring could add significant subtlety without interfering with new players' ability to engage with a game. Christian Freeling's Symple (2010), with its "plant or grow all groups" mechanic where an action happens for all groups each turn, represented another exploitation of this approach. Loop goals, introduced by Trax (1980) and Havannah (1981), provided an alternative win condition to connection and territory.

The concept of mutators also developed, which are general modifications applicable across multiple games. First publicly mentioned around 1999 and attributed to João Pedro Neto, mutators included variations like misère (goal inversion, "playing to lose"), placement of either color, and specific ban patterns. Yodd (2012) exemplified synergistic mutator use, combining 12* protocol with the ability to place tokens of either color. The Crossway ban, popularized by Crossway (2007), prevented certain cutting patterns. Unlur (2002) popularized the contract phase, a pre-game negotiation mechanism. Various attempts to make Go intrinsically finite have appeared, including Sygo (2010), Redstone, Loose, and Stoical Go (all 2012), seeking to eliminate the need for ko rules while preserving the game's essential character.

Some further unique abstract games from the 90s and 2000s include Gess, Quoridor, Blokus, Dameo, Breakthrough, Clobber, Khet, Caylus, and Barca.

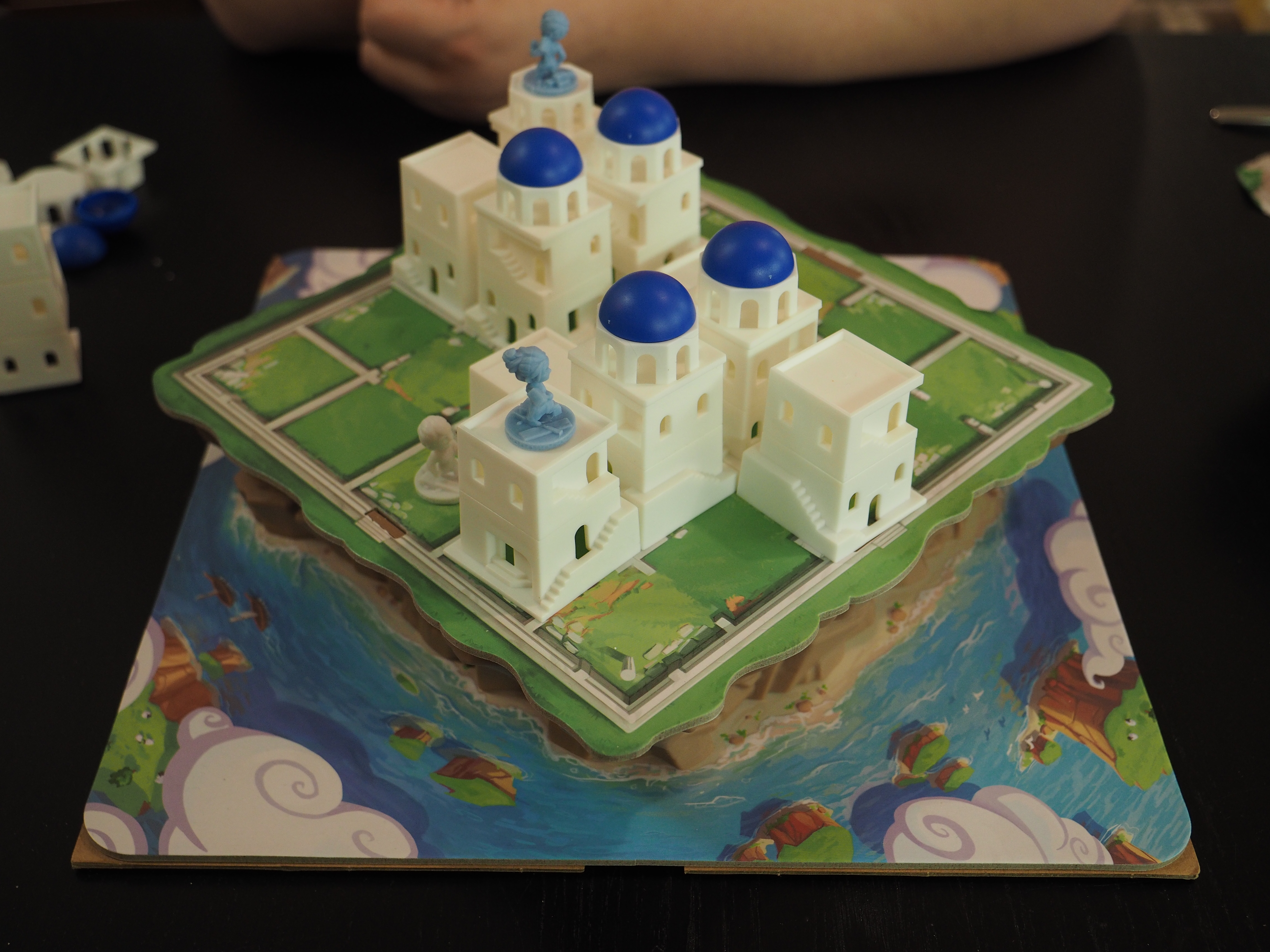
A themed version of Santorini

Recent commercially successful abstracts include Hive (2001), Santorini (2004), Battle Sheep (2010), Tak (2016) and Photosynthesis (2017). Their success illustrates how, despite their decline in mainstream culture, a few abstract games still manage to rise to some level of popularity and compete in the increasingly crowded boardgame market. Nevertheless, while publishers of abstracts like Gigamic succeeded through high production values, most abstract games remain niche products (aside from classics like chess). As such, online platforms have become increasingly important for sustaining player communities and keeping lesser known abstract strategy games alive. Discussions on BoardGameGeek's abstract subforum have provided venues for recent design discussion and community building. Likewise, João Pedro Neto's World of Abstract Games website and Christian Freeling's Mindsports website served as important repositories of information and analysis of abstract games.

=== Cultural and competitive contexts ===
Abstract strategy games have historically been embedded within broader cultural, educational, and philosophical frameworks. In East Asia, games such as go and shogi were traditionally associated with moral cultivation, disciplined thinking, and elite education. In Europe, chess became a central symbol of rationality, and intellectual refinement. Across cultures, abstract games have served as vehicles for social interaction, competition, and the transmission of strategic knowledge.

Modern competitive play has further institutionalized abstract strategy games through ranking systems, organized tournaments, and extensive bodies of literature. Formalized competition has also encouraged the development of standardized rule sets and notational systems, facilitating the preservation and study of exemplary games by elite players, some of whom have become celebrities.

== Study and theory ==
=== Objective analysis ===
Analysis of "pure" abstract strategy games is the subject of combinatorial game theory. This branch of mathematics studies games with perfect information. It analyzes "game states" to determine if a position is a win, loss, or draw. The complexity of a game is often measured by its state-space complexity (total number of legal positions) and game-tree complexity (total number of possible paths the game can take).

Abstract strategy games with hidden information, bluffing, or simultaneous move elements are better served by Von Neumann–Morgenstern game theory, while those with a component of luck may require probability theory incorporated into either of the above.

While ranking abstract strategy games according to qualitative complexity is highly subjective, one can analyze their complexity is purely quantitative terms. In terms of measuring how finite a mathematical field each of the three top contenders represents, it is estimated that checkers has a game-tree complexity of 10^{40} possible games, whereas chess has approximately 10^{123}. As for Go, the possible legal game positions range in the magnitude of 10^{170}.

Combinatorial abstract strategy games have long been used in AI research. Since they are characterized by fixed rules and perfect information, they provide an ideal environment for testing and developing computer algorithms. Perhaps the most famous example is Deep Blue (1997), the first computer to beat a reigning World Chess Champion (Garry Kasparov) using brute-force calculation. AlphaGo (2016), developed by Google's DeepMind lab used neural networks and reinforcement learning to defeat world-class Go champion Lee Sedol. This was a key landmark because Go has more possible positions than there are atoms in the observable universe, making brute force next to impossible.

=== Praxis ===
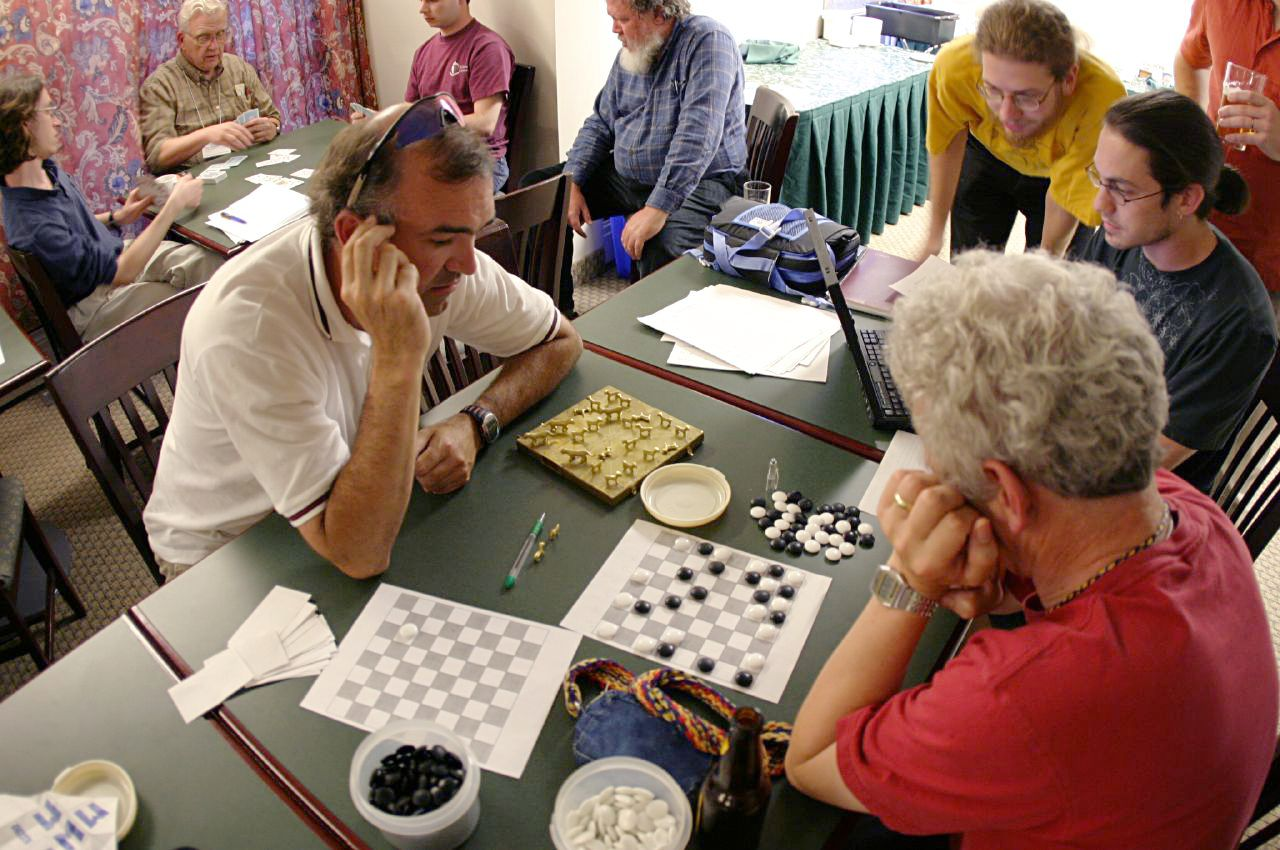
Mathematicians playing Kōnane at a combinatorial game theory workshop

Regarding practical gameplay considerations, many abstract strategy games reward careful analysis of various possible moves, opponent responses, and consequences. This is often referred to by various terms like "calculating", "reading lines", "looking ahead", "forward visualization". However, this is time consuming and tiring, and abstract game players do not just play by brute force calculation. Instead, various heuristics are employed to eliminate bad options and choose optimal paths, which can then be calculated to a certain degree. In practice, these often arise through experience, and intuition, as well as knowledge and study of the game's theory and basic tactics and strategy. In traditional games, heuristics may be passed on through proverbs or widespread sayings, like "a knight on the rim is grim."

David Ploog outlines the following cyclical process for finding a good move in any abstract strategy game: position evaluation, formulation of subgoals, selection of candidate moves, calculating lines. This circle is not linear, since at any one point, one might have to backtrack due to discovering that a specific choice is not optimal. Furthermore, the process will often fork or iterate, as one follows various lines or goals. Ploog also outlines four flavors of heuristics:

- Evaluations: Analyzing a position at all scales
- Strategies: A method for winning that is global, including formulating subgoals
- Tactics: Local scale and short term methods
- Patterns: special moves or structures

A number of strategic concepts recur across many abstract games. The notion of tempo captures the value of forcing moves and strategic initiative. Some capture based abstracts emphasize gaining a material advantage over the opponent by eliminating their pieces and protecting yours. The balance between local tactics and global strategy is especially prominent in games with large boards, where players must decide when to concentrate forces and when to shift attention elsewhere (called tenuki in Go). Concepts like sacrifices, exchanges, and trading material for positional compensation illustrate how evaluation heuristics can be quite dynamic in their engagement with other game patterns and elements. More complex strategies include extensive opening lines, with numerous variations, which are often memorized and studied by high level players.

Abstract strategy games with significant depth and a history of competitive play usually develop a body of theoretical literature, including introductory manuals, game records and advanced theory books. Many traditional abstract games like chess, Go, shogi and xiangqi have an extensive theoretical literature, with centuries of publications. A modest theoretical literature has also developed around a few modern abstract games, such as Hex, Hexachess, Arimaa, Reversi, Tak and Hive.

== Design principles and aesthetics ==
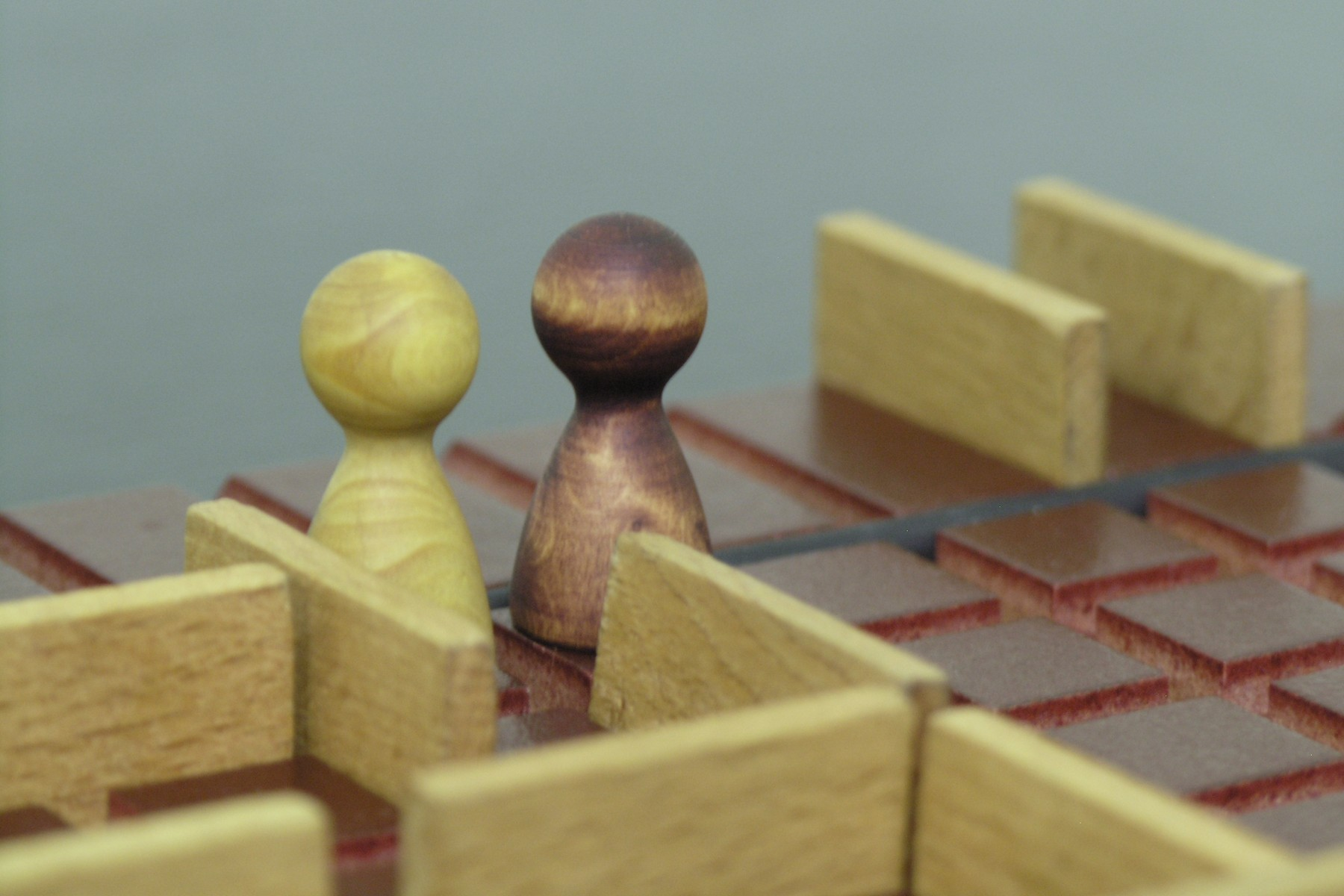
Quoridor, with its minimalist style and wooden pieces exemplifies one strand of modern abstract game design.

The design and evaluation of new abstract strategy games often emphasize conceptual elegance and simplicity, with complexity arising from the combination of a few ingenious rules. Modern designers frequently aim to achieve maximal strategic depth with minimal rules, allowing complexity to emerge naturally from player interaction rather than from elaborate mechanics. Game balance is a central concern for modern game designers, particularly with respect to concepts like first-move advantage. Many abstract games incorporate compensatory mechanisms or refined rule adjustments to address this issue.

Another recurring consideration is the relationship between learnability and mastery. Successful abstract games tend to offer straightforward rules that can be understood quickly, while simultaneously supporting a deep and prolonged learning curve as well as extensive replay value. This combination has contributed to the longevity of classical abstract games, which remain strategically relevant and exciting centuries after their inception. The goal of many modern game designers is captured in the saying "easy to learn, lifetime to master", which is considered to be a feature of the great classics like Go and chess.

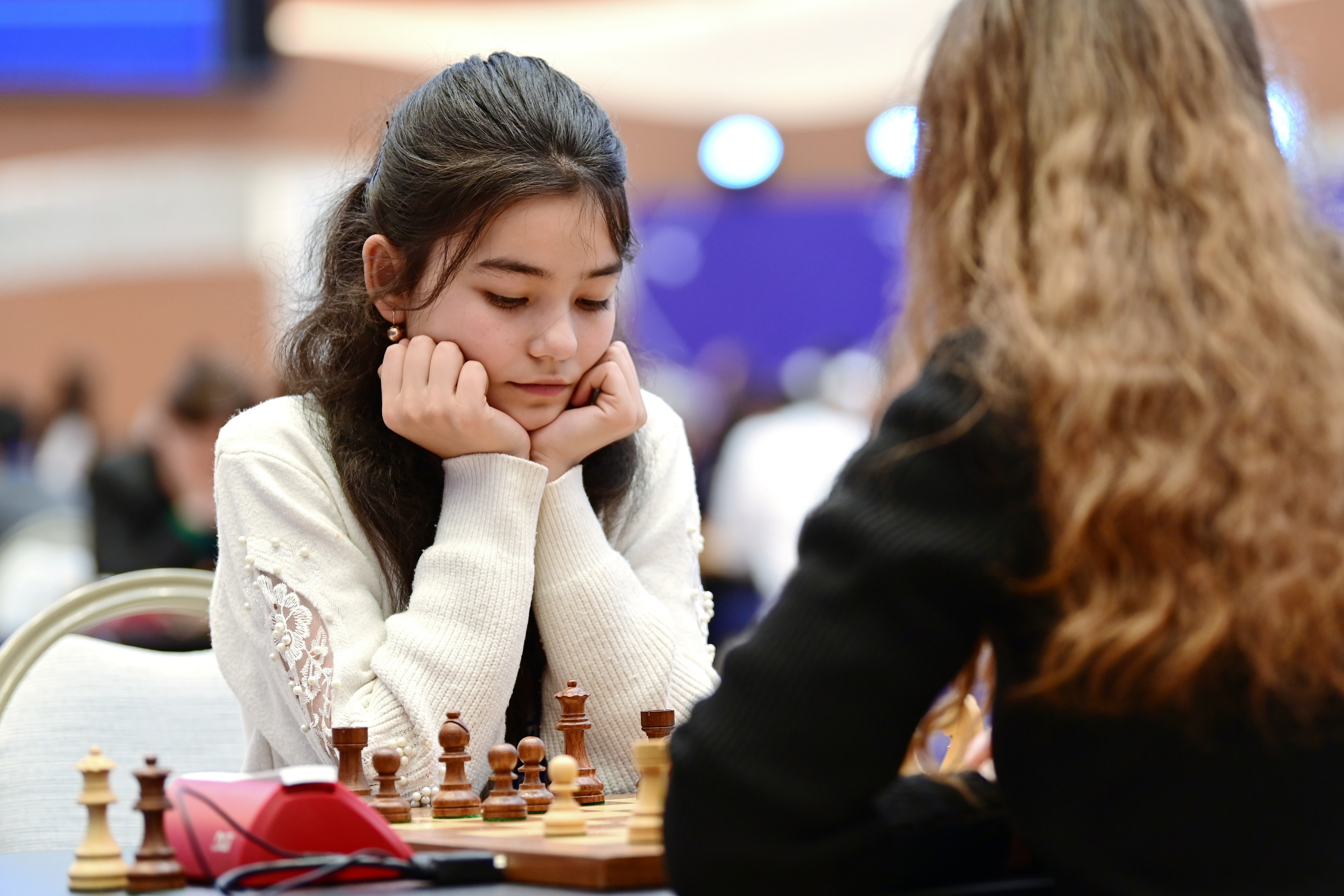
Abstract games that have depth of play are suitable for elite tournament play, often developing a body of theory and literature.

According to J. Mark Thompson, a good abstract must possess four key qualities: depth, clarity, drama, and decisiveness. Depth refers to the capacity of a game to support many distinct levels of skill, such that optimal play remains uncertain in most positions and improvement remains possible over long periods. A deep game resists complete calculation and instead demands refined judgment, allowing measurable stratification among players of different strengths. Clarity, by contrast, concerns intelligibility. In games that are clear, players should generally be able to recognize strong moves, especially decisive ones, and develop reliable heuristics even without exhaustive study. A game that lacks such intelligibility becomes opaque, leaving players without strategic intuition. The challenge for designers lies in ensuring that complexity does not collapse into inscrutability, particularly in newly invented games where it may be difficult to distinguish temporary obscurity from permanent unintelligibility.

Drama requires that a player in an inferior position retain meaningful chances to recover, sustaining suspense and engagement across the whole game rather than allowing early mistakes to render later play pointless. Decisiveness, however, demands that sustained superiority can ultimately be converted into an unavoidable win, rather than being indefinitely neutralized by defensive tactics. Games that fail in this respect risk degenerating into endless draws or futile struggles. Thompson writes that these four qualities exist in tension. Increasing clarity can undermine depth, excessive comeback potential can erode decisiveness, and easily secured wins can drain drama. Only a small number of exceptional games manage to attain a balance between these opposing demands. Such games reward play and serve as profound vehicles for expressing human character and intellect, meriting recognition alongside other liberal arts.

== Designers ==
Certain game designers have proved particularly influential through their games and/or their articulation of design principles and theory. Some important modern designers include:

- Ferdinand Maack (1861–1930): Raumschach (Space chess), an early 3D chess
- Emanuel Lasker (1868–1941): a world chess champion who designed Lasca
- José Raúl Capablanca (1888–1942), a world chess champion who developed "Capablanca chess" after play-testing with Lasker
- George S. Parker (1866–1952): designed numerous commercially procuded games including Camelot
- V. R. Parton (1897–1974): designed many unique chess variants like Alice chess
- Władysław Gliński known for his popular version of Hexagonal chess and his Rules of Hexagonal Chess (1973)
- Piet Hein, the inventor of the influential abstract Hex
- Alex Randolph: TwixT
- Sid Sackson (1920–2002) author of A Gamut of Games. He designed Focus (Domination), and Fields of Action
- Reiner Knizia: Ingenious, Through the Desert, Samurai and Tigris & Euphrates, Cascadero
- Wolfgang Kramer: Torres, El Grande
- Robert Abbott: Baroque chess, Epaminondas, Crossings
- Andrew J. Looney, inventor of the icehouse pieces, used to play many abstract games like Martian chess and Homeworlds
- Ralph Betza a FIDE Master who designed many chess variants like Chess with different armies, Avalanche chess, and Way of the Knight.
- Christian Freeling: known for the Mindsports webpage and games like Dameo (2000), Havannah and Symple (2010)
- Kris Burm who designed the unique GIPF Series of games
- James Ernest, best known for Tak
- Mark Steere: Atoll, Oust
- Phil Leduc: Murus Gallicus (2009)
- Luis Bolaños Mures: Kingo (Go with two types of stones), 3D Amazons
- Cameron Browne: Shibumi, Yavalath
- Nick Bentley: Catchup (2010), Blooms
- Dieter Stein: Ordo, Volo, Enso

== Challenges and competitions ==
Various competitions and challenges have spurred innovation in the design of abstract strategy games. Portugal's Campeonato Nacional de Jogos Matemáticos (2004–present), the World Mind Sports Games held by the International Mind Sports Association (IMSA) and the Mind Sport Olympiads (1997–present) have provided competitive venues that sustained interest and rewarded excellence in various abstract strategy games.

The Computer Olympiad (founded 1989) has tracked AI progress across multiple games. The 8×8 design competition that was won by Breakthrough encouraged further minimalist approaches to familiar board sizes. The Code Cup, beginning in 2003, developed strong AIs for obscure games, providing analytical tools and raising profiles of otherwise unknown designs.

=== Abstract Games World Championship ===
The Mind Sports Olympiad first held the Abstract Games World Championship in 2008 to try to find the best abstract strategy games all-rounder. The MSO event saw a change in format in 2011 restricting the competition to players' five best events. During the four years span of 2014–2017, the title was not awarded. From 2018 to 2022 the tournament was reintroduced under the name Modern Abstract Games World Championships. In 2023 it was renamed back to Abstract Games World Championships and only the games with perfect information remained under this category.

As of 2025 Andres Kuusk holds the record of most World Champion titles with 8. David Pearce has won the title four times and Florian Jamain twice.

- 2008: David M. Pearce (England)
- 2009: David M. Pearce (England)
- 2010: David M. Pearce (England)
- 2011: David M. Pearce (England)
- 2012: Andres Kuusk (Estonia)
- 2013: Andres Kuusk (Estonia)
- 2018: Andres Kuusk (Estonia)
- 2019: Andres Kuusk (Estonia)
- 2020: Andres Kuusk (Estonia)
- 2021: Andres Kuusk (Estonia)
- 2022: Andres Kuusk (Estonia)
- 2023: Florian Jamain (France)
- 2024: Florian Jamain (France)
- 2025: Andres Kuusk (Estonia)

== See also ==
- Connection games
- Game complexity
- List of abstract strategy games
- List of world championships in mind sports
- Mind Sports Olympiad
- World Mind Sports Games
