= Radlands (game) =

2021 board game

- Designers: Daniel Piechnick
- Illustrators: Manny Trembley Damien Mammoliti Gavan Brown
- Publishers: Roxley; Deutsch: Grimspire
- Publication: 2021
- Genres: Board game
- Players: 2
- Playing time: 20–40 minutes
- Chance: Medium
- Age range: 14+
- Website: roxley.com/products/radlands

Radlands is a two-player tabletop game created by Daniel Piechnick and published in 2021. The game was published after a successful Kickstarter campaign. It has a post-apocalyptic setting and features bright neon colors.

== Background and development ==
Radlands was designed by Daniel Piechnick, a former Magic: The Gathering developer and player, and published by Roxley. The game was published in 2021 after a successful Kickstarter campaign. Radlands was illustrated by Manny Trembley and Damien Mammoliti while graphic design was done by Gavan Brown.

== Gameplay and design ==
Radlands is a two-player game based on lane-battling. Each player starts the game with three base camps which they must defend; a player wins by destroying all of their opponent's base camps. On each turn, players draw a card from a deck containing characters and events. Characters are played in front of camps, and camps cannot be directly attacked while a character is in front of them. Events activate a certain number of turns after they are played. Water is used as the main currency in the game, with characters and events requiring water to play and the abilities of characters and bases requiring water to activate. Players start each turn with three water tokens.

Gameplay is fast-paced, with powerful cards allowing the state of the game to shift rapidly. While cards generally require at least one turn before their abilities can be used, the limited amount of resources players have make it difficult to mitigate an opponent's powerful cards while also playing offensively. The high power of certain cards is balanced by the very limited supply of water.

The game is designed with a vibrant neon art style while taking place in a post-apocalyptic setting.

== Reception ==
Radlands received generally positive reviews. Matt Thrower, writing for GamesRadar+, rated the game with 4/5 stars, describing the game as being easy to learn and understand while using its rules and mechanics to their full potential, enabling fast and dynamic gameplay. Matthew Monagle's review in /Film similarly rated the game highly, praising the difficult trade-offs the game forces players to make, as well as its art style and lack of need for expansions. James Austin's review in The New York Times wrote that it was "a quick and exciting game to play".
