= Santorini (game) =

Abstract strategy board game

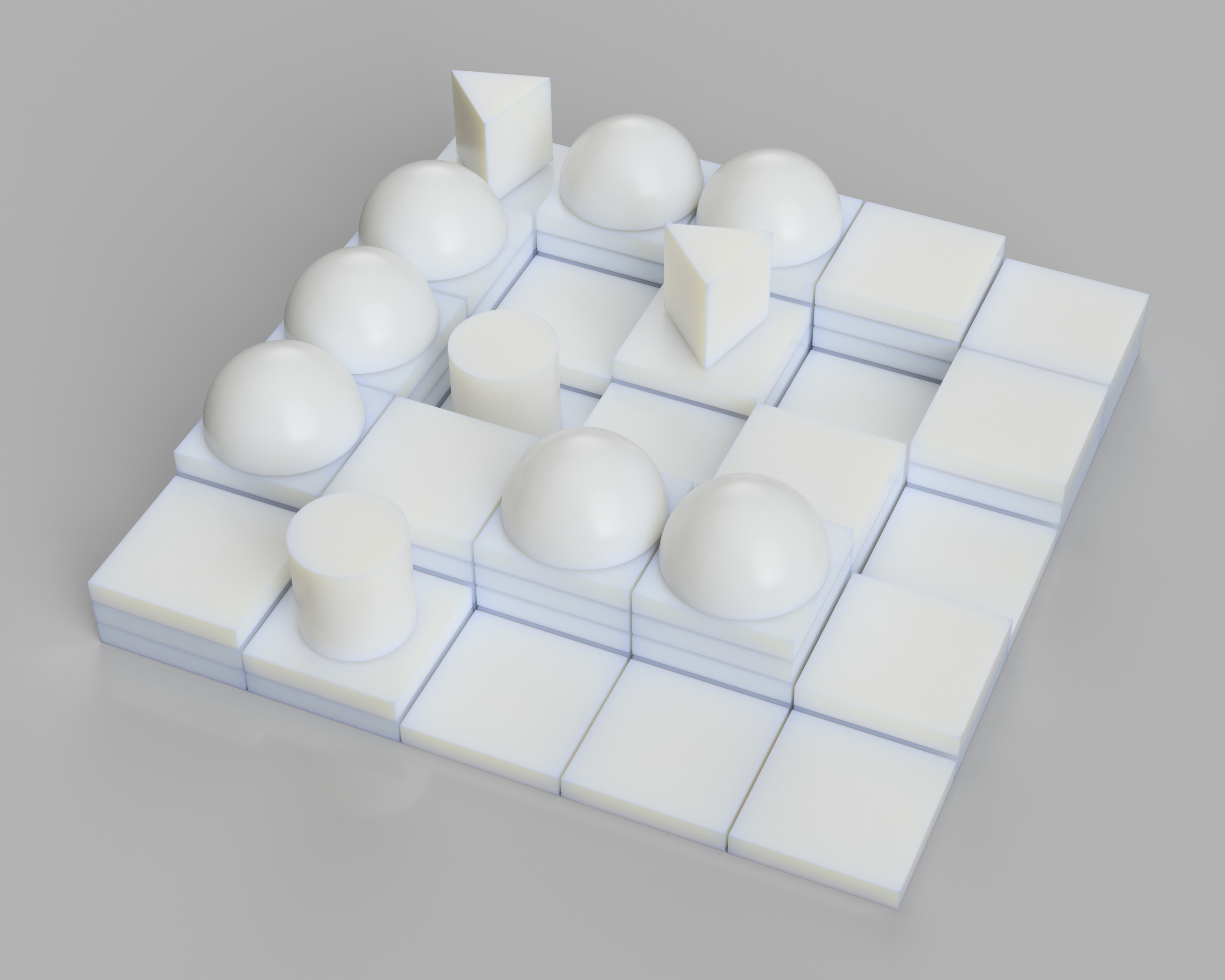
- Santorini game
- Designers: Gordon Hamilton
- Publishers: Roxley Games
- Players: 2–4
- Setup time: 1 minute
- Playing time: 15-20 minutes
- Chance: None
- Ages: 8+

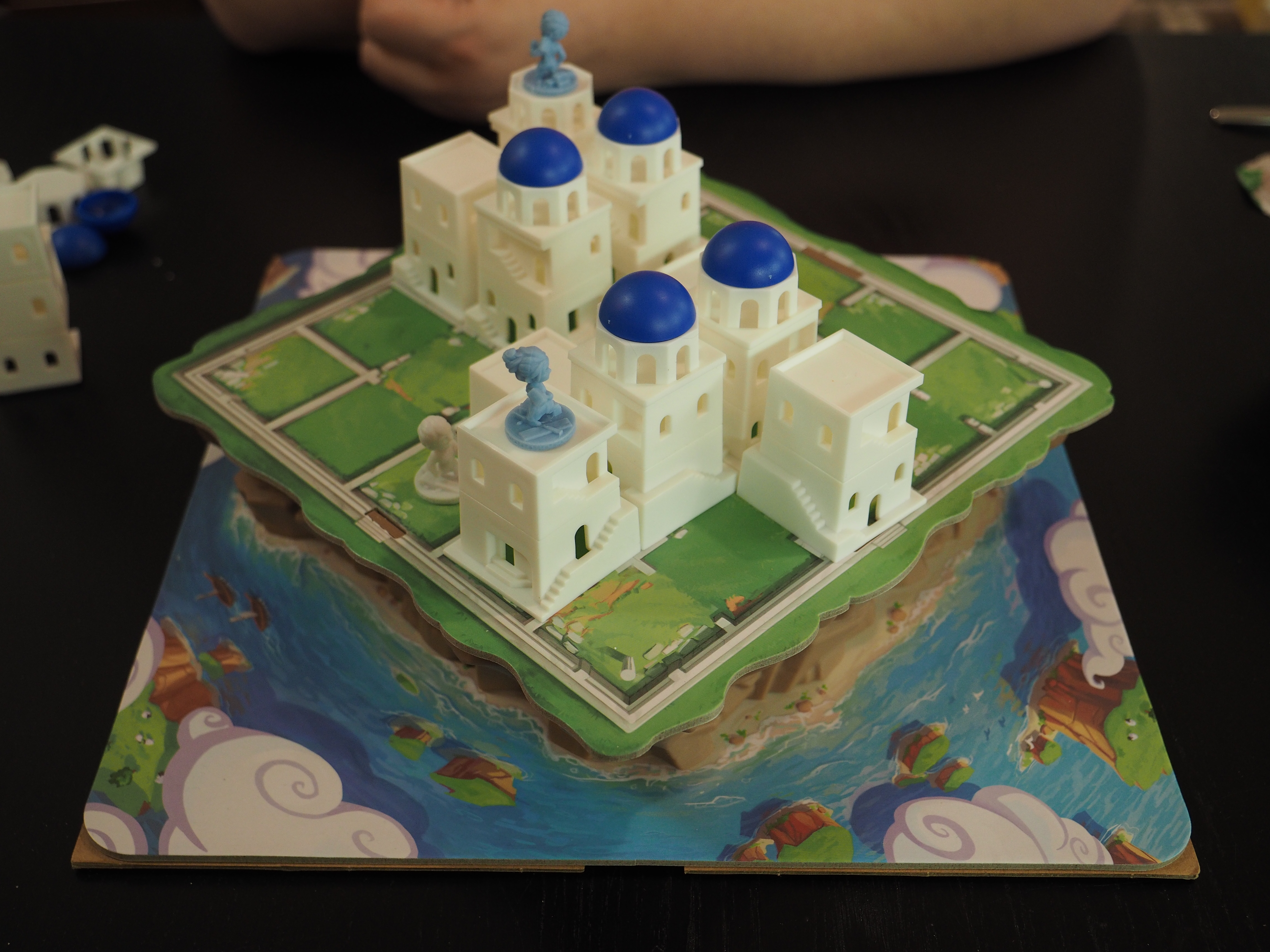
The Roxley Games re-release of Santorini is themed after Greek villages, unlike the abstract look of the original game.

Santorini is an abstract strategy board game for 2-4 players designed by Gordon Hamilton in 1985. He published the all-white wooden version in 2004. It was republished via Kickstarter in 2016 by Roxley Games. Inspired by the architecture of cliffside villages on Santorini Island in Greece, and primarily designed for two players, the game is played on a grid where each turn players build a town by placing building pieces up to three levels high. To win the game, players must move one of their two characters to the third level of the town.

== Gameplay ==
Each turn of play involves moving one of your two pieces around a 5-by-5 grid and then placing a tile adjacent to the moved piece, building up that spot of the board. On subsequent turns, pieces may be moved onto one of these built-up tiles, but only one level up at a time. Pieces may also be moved down any number of levels. Players may also place a special dome tile on top of a three-level building, which prevents a player from moving onto that spot for the remainder of the game.

The primary winning condition is to get one of your pieces onto the third level, though players may also win if their opponent is unable to make a move.

The Roxley Games version of Santorini introduced a god powers variant, which gives each player a unique way to break the rules.

== Expansions and spin-off games ==
The game has two expansions, the Golden Fleece released in 2017 and the Riddle of the Sphinx released in 2025.

There has also been various spinoffs including Santorini: New York released in 2020 and Santorini: Pantheon Edition released in 2025.

== Release and Reception ==
After being directly released and sold by Hamilton in 2004, Roxley Games ran a Kickstarter campaign during March-April 2016, drawing over 7,100 backers and raising over C$700,000, the most successful Kickstarter campaign ever based in Alberta. While the original release used plain white blocks as components, the Roxley version featured an enhanced cartoon-like look to the game, which Hamilton credits for success of the Kickstarter campaign. The game was released in retail outlets in January 2017. A second edition that rebalanced the game was also released in 2025.

A review on The Wirecutter stated that the game is "fun and easy to learn", but that "players can get knocked out early on" for games with more than two players.
