= Keny (game) =

Board Game

	1		2		3		4
5		6		7		8
	9		10		11		12
13		14		15		16
	17		18		19		20
21		22		23		24
	25		26		27		28
29		30		31		32

Diagram 1: Starting positions for Keny

Keny (Russian: Кены) is a draughts game played in the Caucasus and nearby areas of Turkey. Keny is actually the Ossetian name for the game as it is most popular in Ossetia, a region in the Caucasus. In Armenia, it is called Vayut tama (Russian: вают тама). The game is also known as Caucasian checkers (Russian: кавказские шашки). There may be slight variations of the game, but the rules described here are from Nikita Sokolov (Никита Соколов) from his article "It's been a while since we took checkers into our hands..." ("Давненько не брали мы в руки шашек...") (2005).

== Rules ==
The game resembles both Turkish and Armenian draughts in that all these games use an 8 x 8 uncheckered square board, have 16 men or checkers (an unpromoted man is called a "ken", or Russian: кен) initially placed in each player's second and third ranks, and allow for men and kings to move orthogonally (a king is called a "pepper", or Russian: перец). It resembles Turkish draughts more in that the ken can only move forward or sideways (left or right) onto an orthogonally adjacent vacant square until it is promoted to king in which case it can also move backwards, and in addition move any number of unoccupied squares in all four orthogonal directions. (Note: This is unlike Armenian draughts where (unpromoted) men may also move diagonally forward, and kings may move in all eight orthogonal and diagonal directions any number of unoccupied squares.)

A ken can capture an orthogonally adjacent enemy piece using the short leap method as in draughts whereby the ken leaps over the orthogonally adjacent enemy piece and lands on an unoccupied square immediately behind it, but unlike both Turkish draughts and Armenian draughts, a ken can capture an orthogonally adjacent enemy piece backward. As in Turkish and Armenian draughts, multiple enemy pieces can be captured in a single turn, captures are mandatory, and a ken promotes to pepper upon reaching the other player's first rank. (Note: In many other sources, capturing is not mandatory! Sokolov also does not specifically mention if a player is required to choose the capturing sequence with the most number of enemy pieces if more than one capturing sequence is available, but in other sources, a player may choose any capturing sequence as long as he completes the capturing sequence. Sokolov also does not mention if a ken upon reaching the other player's first rank and thus becoming a pepper, can continue capturing in the same turn (other sources do not describe this case also).) The pepper is the equivalent of the flying king in Turkish and Armenian draughts in that it can capture an enemy piece from any orthogonal direction as long as there is no obstruction between the pepper and the enemy piece and any obstruction between the enemy piece and where the pepper is to land.

A ken can leap over an orthogonally adjacent friendly ken and land on an unoccupied square immediately beyond it, and this is similar to the short leap in draughts except that the friendly ken is not captured. (Note: Sokolov mentions that a ken can continue leaping over friendly kens, but in other sources only one friendly ken may be leaped over in a turn or they do not elaborate on this issue. Sokolov and other sources do not explicitly rule out that a ken can leap over a friendly ken backwards. Sokolov and other sources do not mention if a ken can leap over a friendly pepper although they don't necessarily rule it out. Lastly, Sokolov and other sources do not mention if a pepper can leap over a friendly ken or pepper although they don't necessarily rule it out.) (Note: This type of movement resembles those found in a family of games that includes Halma, Ugolki, Chinese checkers, Conspirateurs, and Salta.) This type of movement is unusual in draughts and allows for pieces to move quicker.

As in most draughts games, the objective is to capture all of your opponent's pieces or block them thus preventing them from performing a legal move. If anytime during the game, no captures are committed in 10 successive turns, then the game is deemed a draw.

== See also ==
- Draughts
- Turkish Draughts
- Armenian Draughts
- Dameo
- Tobit
- Ossetia
