= Leap Frog (board game) =

Board game

Leap Frog, also known as Leapfrog, is a multi-player abstract strategy board game that was described by H.J.R. Murray in A History of Board Games Other Than Chess (1898) and attributes its origin to England. Several variants have been created (see Variants section) including one by Murray himself which utilizes different colored pieces with alternative point values. In the traditional game, players take any piece on the board and use it to hop over and capture other pieces. When no more pieces can be captured, the game ends, and the player with the most pieces is the winner. Murray includes it in the section called Clearance Games which has the game Solitaire. It resembles Solitaire in many ways except that Solitaire is typically only played by one person.

Murray never stated that the moves are limited to orthogonal directions. The game might still work with diagonal moves.

== Setup ==
A rectangular board with 15 to 18 squares in length on each side is used. The pieces in the traditional variant are undifferentiated.

In Murray's variant, the pieces have different colors with alternative point values. The number of pieces per color is divided as follows: 1 green for every 2 red, for every 3 yellow, for every 4 white. In a 15 x 15 square board that would be 22 green, 45 red, 68 yellow, and 90 white pieces. Green pieces are worth 4 points, red pieces are worth 3 points, yellow pieces are worth 2 points, and white pieces are worth 1 point.

The game starts with the pieces occupying all the squares (or holes) on the board. Only one piece may occupy a square (or hole). Similarly, in Murray's variant, the colored pieces are distributed randomly throughout the board occupying all the squares (or holes).

== Rules ==
- Each player removes one piece anywhere from the board for their first capture. The first turn by each player need not be taken in any order.
- Players then decide the order of their turns and alternate their turns throughout the game in the same order.
- All moves after the first turn of each player must be capturing moves using the short leap method as in draughts. A piece from the board is chosen by a player on their turn, and this chosen piece is used to leap over other piece(s) which are captured and removed immediately. All leaps must be orthogonal (not diagonal). The chosen piece leaps over an orthogonally adjacent piece, and lands on a vacant square (or hole) immediately behind it. The chosen piece can continue capturing more pieces (in the same turn) provided it is able to, but it is not mandatory to capture more than one piece. The chosen piece remains on the board at the end of its leap(s), and that player's turn ends.
- If a player cannot capture at least one piece during their turn, the game ends. Players then count the number of pieces they've captured (in the old variant) or calculate the number of points they've earned (in Murray's variant), and the one with the most pieces or points is the winner.

== Variants ==
An online software variant by BrainKing called Froglet is similar to Murray's variant. The only differences are that the size of the board is smaller (only a 12 x 12 square board), the order of play among the players is determined before the game commences and only the first player may remove a piece anywhere from the board for their first move followed by capturing moves by the short leap thereafter by all players. The color distribution among pieces is also different (66 green pieces, 51 yellow pieces, 21 red pieces, and 6 blue pieces) with 1 point for a green, 2 points for a yellow, 3 points for a red, and 4 points for a blue.

A variant of Chinese Checkers called Capture resembles the old variant of Leap Frog, except in Capture the six-pointed star-shaped board of Chinese Checkers is used, and specifically only the central hexagon region of the board. In addition, the central point of the board is vacant at the beginning of the game in Capture, whereas the board is completely filled in Leap Frog.

== Related Games ==
- Froglet
- Chinese Checkers variant called Capture
- Konane
- Main Chuki or Tjuki
- Peg solitaire
- Draughts
- Pasang
