= Kōnane =

Two-player strategy board game from Hawaii

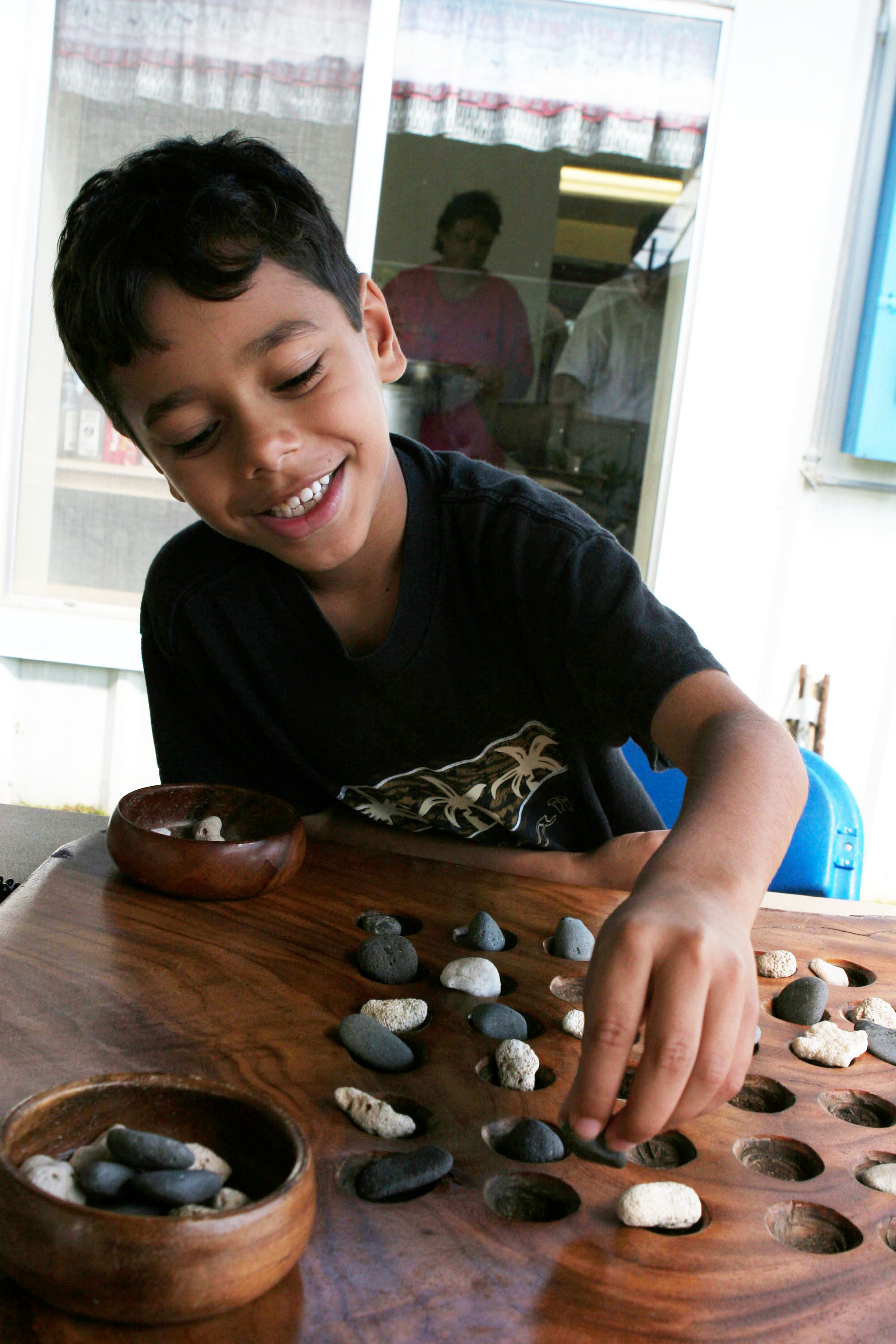
- A child playing Kōnane with stones on a wooden board
- Genres: Board game; Abstract strategy game; Mind sport
- Skills: Strategy, tactics
- Synonyms: Mū (rare)

Kōnane (or rarely mū) is a two-player Hawaiian strategy board game invented and played by its native people. The game is played on a rectangular board and begins with black and white counters filling the board in an alternating pattern. Players then hop over one another's pieces, capturing them. All moves are capturing moves.

== Background ==
The game was traditionally played using a large carved rock that functioned as both the board and a table, with small pieces of white coral and black lava as the game pieces. The Puʻuhonua o Hōnaunau National Historical Park has one of these stone gameboards on its premises.

The kōnane was recorded in the Kumulipo, and was also noted by James Cook, who described the game during his only visit to Hawaii on his third and final voyage prior to his death there. The word mū may have referred the act of capturing people.

Kōnane has some resemblance to games like mū tōrere from Aotearoa, leap frog and brainvita (also called peg solitaire) from England, fanorona from Madagascar, and main cuki (also spelled chuki or tjuki) among the Malays and Javanese. The game also has some similarities as well with checkers or draughts.

The Bishop Museum organized the first professional tournament of the game in February 2026.

== Equipment ==
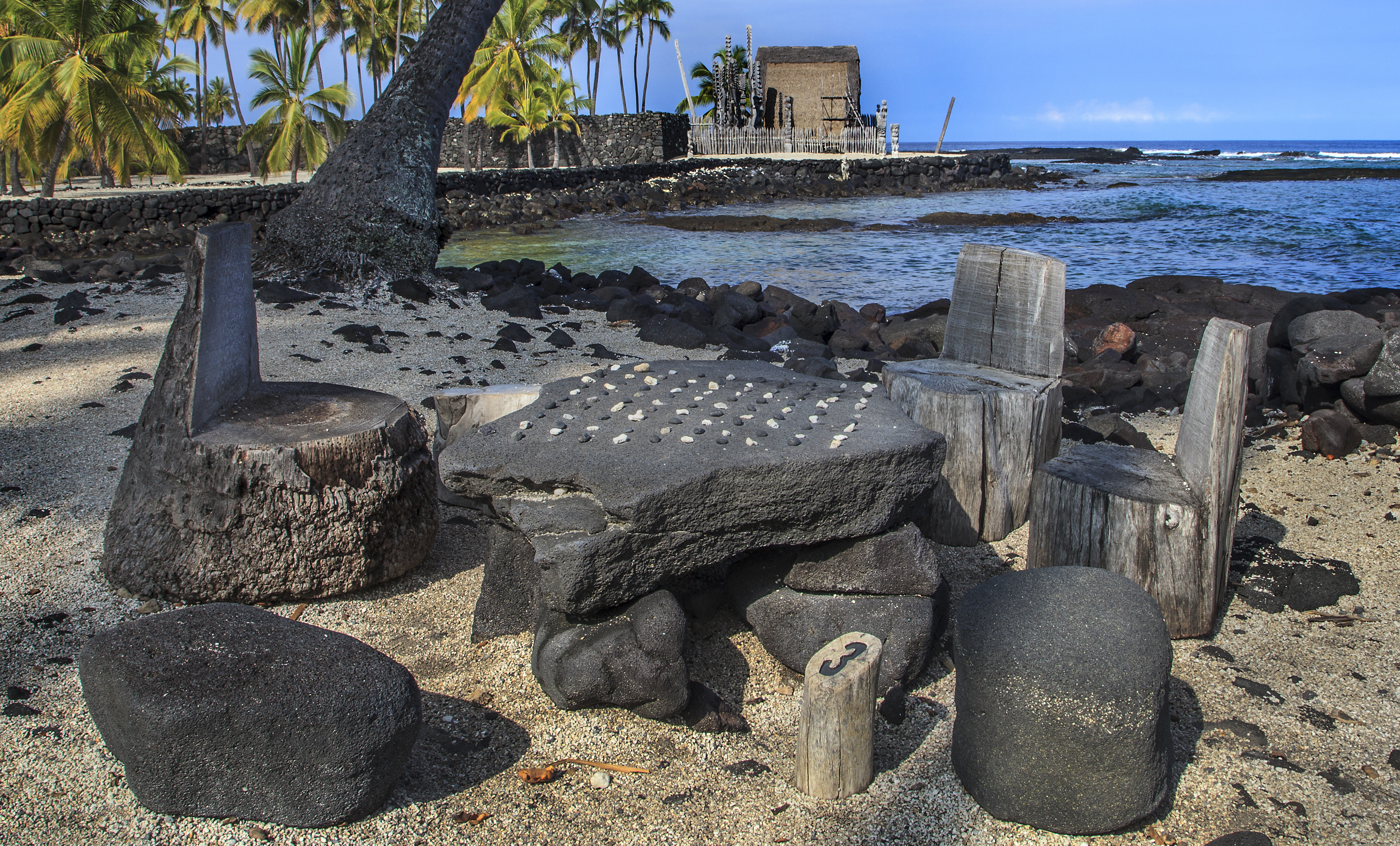
Konane gaming table erroneously set up at Puʻuhonua o Hōnaunau NHP, 2017

The game is traditionally played on a rectangular board papa,(also papa mū "capture board" or papamū) consisting of an even and odd number of columns and rows, though modern kōnane is often played on a square board with an even number of both columns and rows. Modern versions use felt boards and marbles as pieces.

Pieces are laid out in the beginning of the game in an alternating checkerboard pattern of two colors on top of a table, on the ground, or on any flat surface sometimes with indented (puka). Furthermore, the game can be generalized to any size geometrically.

Captures are made in an orthogonal direction (not diagonally) by "jumping" over the opposite color piece into an empty space. In a multiple-capture move, the capturing piece may not change direction. The first player unable to capture is the loser.

In practice, square kōnane boards can range from 6×6 to over 14×14. Traditional rectangular board dimensions include 6×7, 8×9, 9×13, 14×17, and 13×20.

== Rules and gameplay ==
The game begins with all the pieces on the board (or table, ground, etc.) arranged in an alternating pattern. Players decide which colors to play (black or white).

1. Black traditionally starts first and must remove one of their pieces either from the middle of the board, where there are 2 black and 2 white pieces that are diagonally opposite each other or remove a black piece from one of the four corners of the board (which will also consist of 2 black and 2 white pieces diagonally opposite from each other).
2. White then removes one of their pieces orthogonally adjacent to the empty space created by Black. There are now two orthogonally adjacent empty spaces on the board.
3. From here on, players take turns capturing each other's pieces. All moves must be capturing moves. A player captures an enemy piece by hopping over it with their own piece similar to draughts; however, unlike draughts, captures can be done only orthogonally and not diagonally. The player's piece hops over the orthogonally adjacent enemy piece and lands on a vacant space immediately beyond.
4. The player's piece can continue to hop over enemy pieces, but only in the same orthogonal direction.
5. The player can stop hopping over enemy pieces at any time, but must at least capture one enemy piece in a turn.
6. After the piece has stopped hopping, the player's turn ends. Only one piece may be used in a turn to capture enemy pieces.

The player unable to make a capture is the loser; their opponent is the winner. It is impossible to draw in Kōnane, because one player eventually cannot perform a capture.

== Mathematical analysis ==
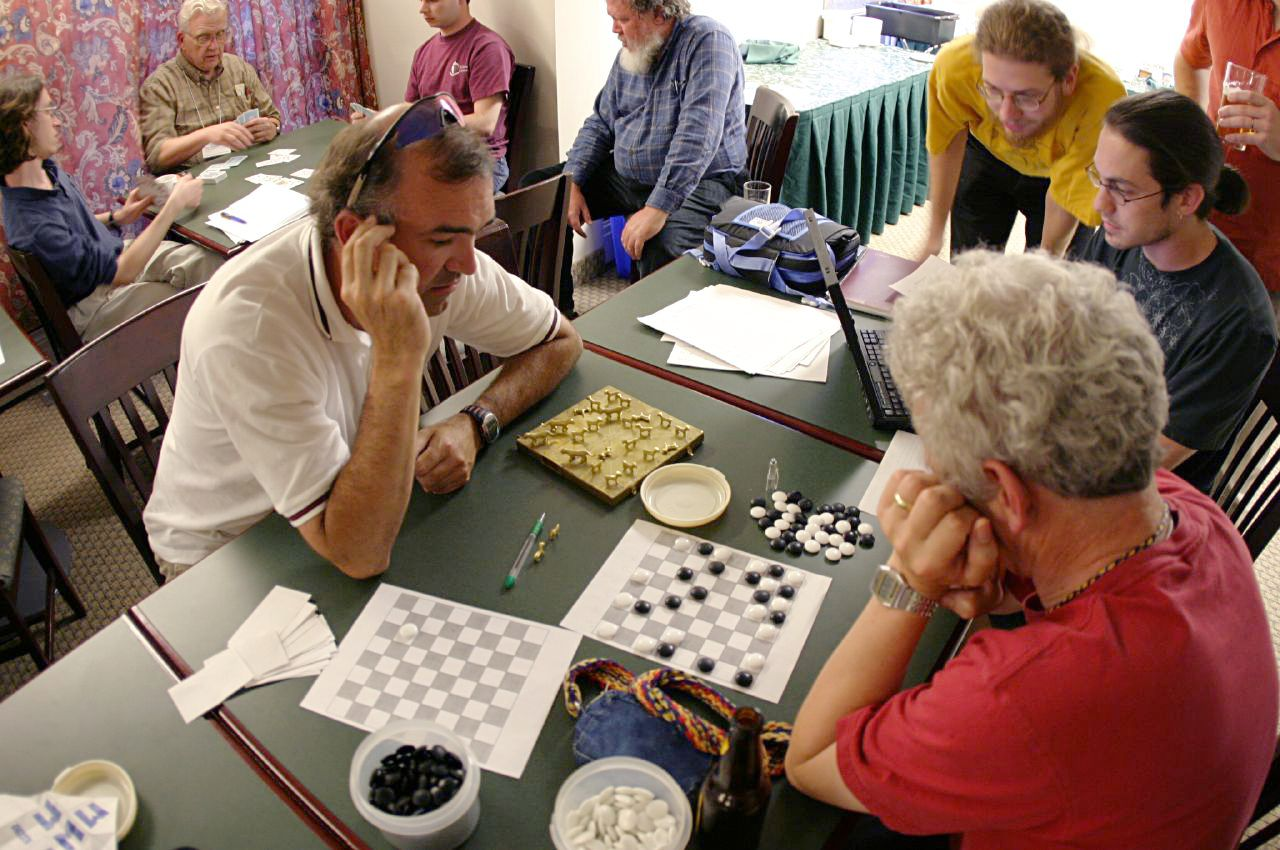
Mathematicians playing kōnane at a combinatorial game theory workshop

Bob Hearn proved that Kōnane is PSPACE-complete with respect to the dimensions of the board, by a reduction from nondeterministic constraint logic. There have been some positive results for restricted configurations. Ernst derives Combinatorial-Game-Theoretic values for several interesting positions. Chan and Tsai analyze the 1 × n game, but even this version of the game is not yet solved. In the 2008 paper "Konane has infinite nim-dimension", Carlos Pereira dos Santos and Jorge Nuna Silva showed that Kōnane contains all other combinatorial games.

== See also ==
- Fanorona
- Mū tōrere
