= Congo (chess variant) =

Chess variant

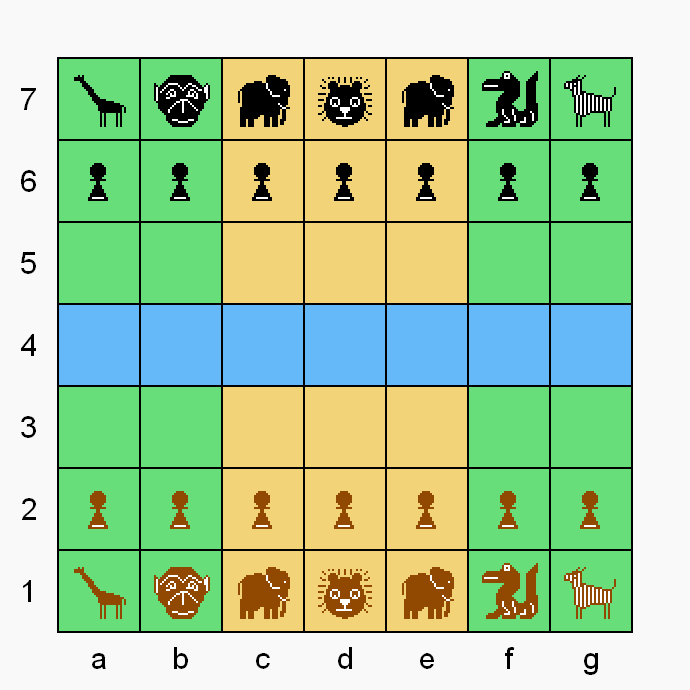
Congo gameboard and starting setup. In the diagram, castles are tan color; the river is blue. Initial setup: giraffes (a-file), monkeys (b-file), elephants (c- and e-files), lions (d-file), crocodiles (f-file), and zebras (g-file). Pawns fill each player's second rank.

Congo is a chess variant invented by Demian Freeling in 1982 when he was nearly 8 years old. His father, Dutch abstract games designer Christian Freeling, encouraged him to design a variant using a 7×7 gameboard. Demian was already familiar with chess and xiangqi, and the result blends some features from both. Congo became the second-most popular chess variant at the Fanaat games club in Enschede, the Netherlands.

For his Congo engine, Ed van Zon won "Best of the Zillions" First Contest, Best Chess-Related Category in March 2001.

== Board ==
The play is on the squares of a 7×7 gameboard. The board has two 3×3 castles to house the lions. A river divides the board horizontally across the center.

== Game rules ==
The starting setup is as shown. White (brown pieces in the diagram) moves first. Players alternate turns; there is no passing. The game is won by capturing the opponent's lion. The game immediately ends when a lion has been captured.

Moving out of check is not mandatory in Congo, and a lion may move to an attacked square, but the opponent wins immediately by simply capturing it. Consequently, Congo also has no draw by stalemate—stalemate is simply an extreme form of zugzwang, resulting in a loss for the stalemated player.

=== Lion ===
The lion moves and captures one step orthogonally or diagonally in any direction—the same as a king in chess. It may not leave its 3×3 castle. The lion also has the special power to capture the enemy lion by moving as a chess queen across the river along an unobstructed file or diagonal—like the special "flying general" move of a xiangqi general.

=== Zebra ===
The zebra moves and captures in the same way as a knight in chess. It jumps two squares vertically and one square horizontally, or two squares horizontally and one square vertically.

=== Elephant ===
An elephant can move [to] and capture [on] a square one or two orthogonal steps away. If two steps away, the move or capture must be in a straight line, and the intervening square is jumped (whether occupied or not, unlike the xiangqi elephant which is blocked by a diagonally adjacent piece). Unlike the xiangqi elephant, it may cross the river.

=== Giraffe ===
The giraffe moves (but does not capture) one step in any direction. It can also move [to] and capture [on] a square two steps away in any direction in a straight line. The intervening square is jumped (whether occupied or not).

=== Monkey ===
The monkey moves (but does not capture) one step in any direction. It can also capture an enemy man on an adjacent square (orthogonally or diagonally) by jumping over it to the vacant square immediately beyond. As in international draughts, multiple captures are permitted with the same piece in the same turn.

In a multi-capture move:

- Successive jumps can be in different directions;
- A given man may be jumped only once;
- A given square may be visited more than once;
- All men jumped are removed from play only after the entire multi-capture move has completed.

Unlike draughts, a capturing move is never mandatory in Congo.

=== Crocodile ===
The crocodile moves and captures one step in any direction. It can also move and capture as a chess rook toward the river along a file (including entering the river), as well as down the river (rank) when in the river.

=== Pawn ===
A pawn moves and captures one step straight or diagonally forward. When past the river, it can also move (but not capture) one or two steps straight backward (without jumping).

A pawn promotes to superpawn when reaching the last rank. A superpawn has the same move/capture as a pawn, but in addition can move and capture one step straight sideways, and move (but not capture) one or two steps straight or diagonally backward (without jumping). A superpawn's powers are not dependent on its position on the board.

=== Drowning ===
Except for the crocodile, any piece ending its move in the river must leave the river the next turn or it drowns. A drowned piece is removed from play at the end of the turn.

A monkey may enter and leave the river during a multi-capture move without consequence; it drowns if it ends two consecutive turns in the river. If the monkey drowns after completing a multi-capture move, the captures it made are still legal.

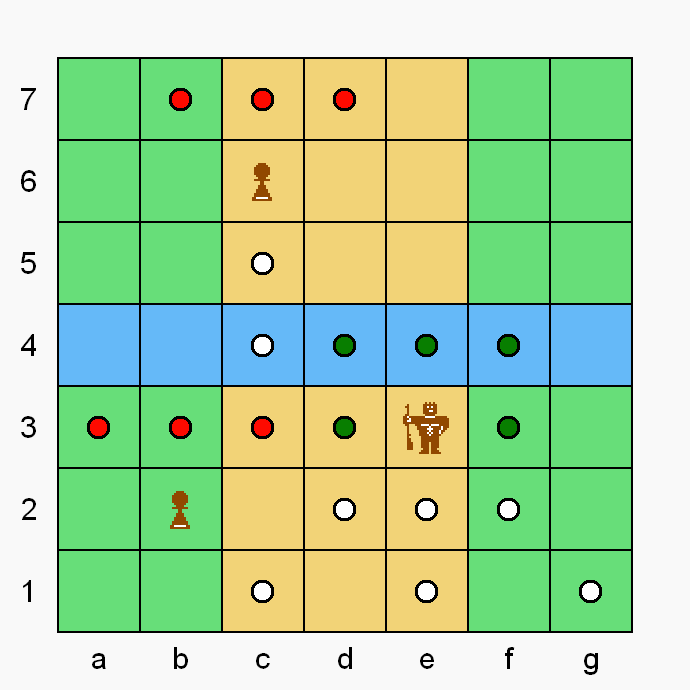
Brown's pawn on b2 can move or capture to any red dot in front. Brown's c6-pawn has crossed the river, so additionally can move backwards one or two steps (no jumping) to a white dot. Brown's superpawn on e3 can move or capture to any dark green dot, and can move backwards (not capture) to any white dot (no jumping).

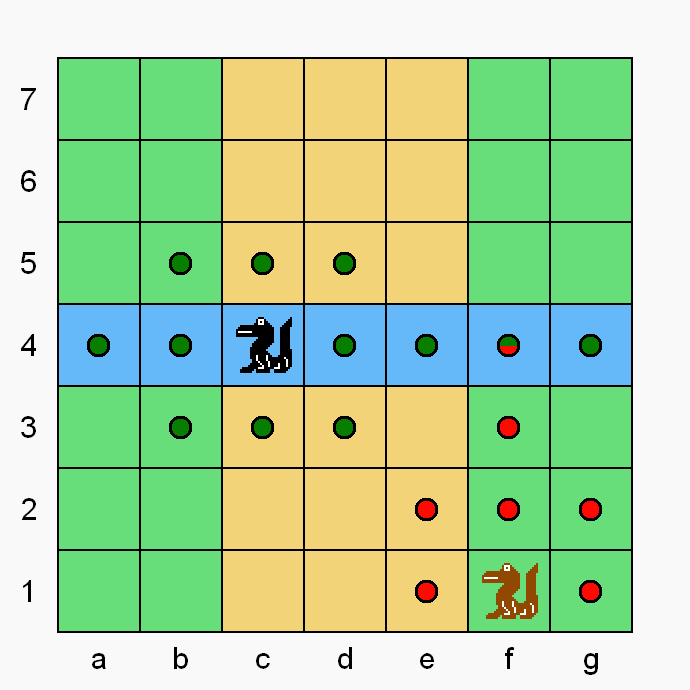
Brown's crocodile can move or capture to any dot with red. Black's crocodile can move or capture to any dot with dark green.

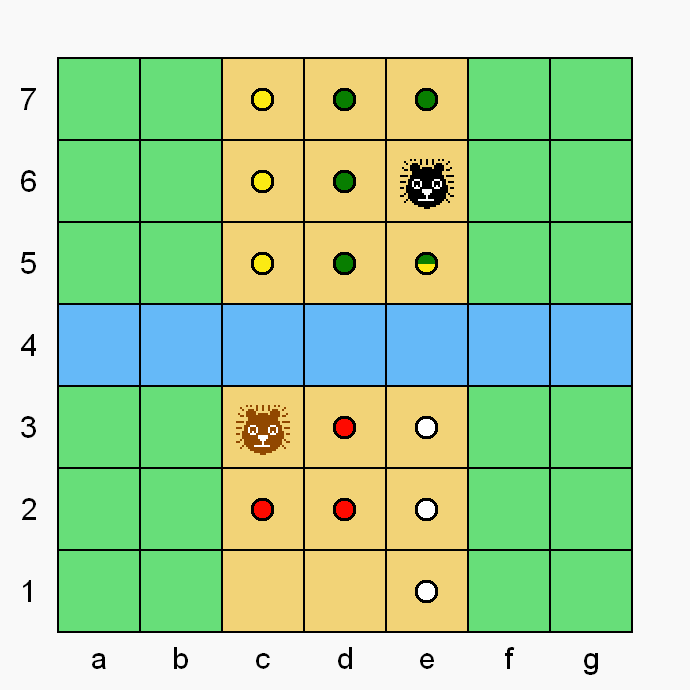
In the diagram, Brown's lion can move or capture to red dots. Black's lion can move or capture to dots with dark green. Additionally, Brown's lion can capture Black's lion if the latter strays to a square containing dot with yellow. Black's lion can capture Brown's lion if the latter strays to a white dot.

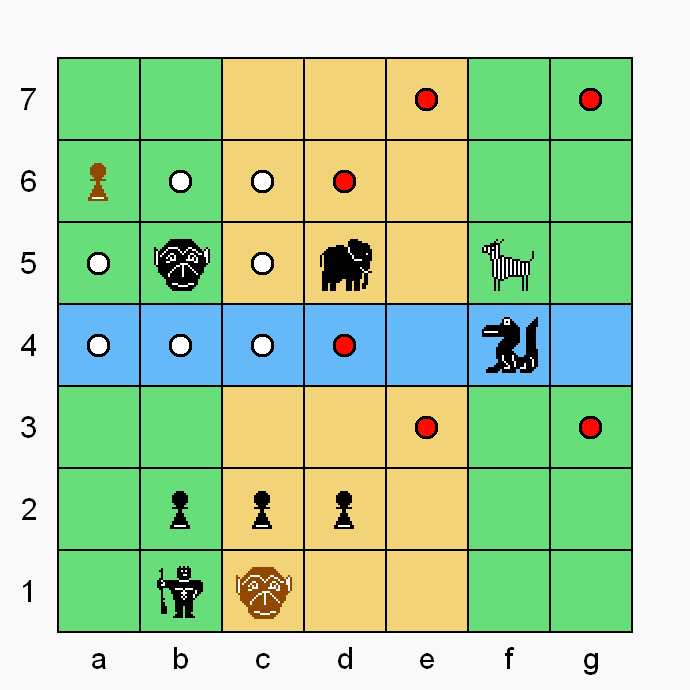
Black's zebra can move or capture like a chess knight to a red dot.
Black's monkey can move (not capture) to white dots. It is blocked from moving to a6 due to Brown's pawn. Black's monkey has no captures (jumps) available.
Brown's monkey can capture all Black's pieces in one multi-capture move by jumping consecutively to a1, c3, c1, e3, g5, e5, c5, and a5.

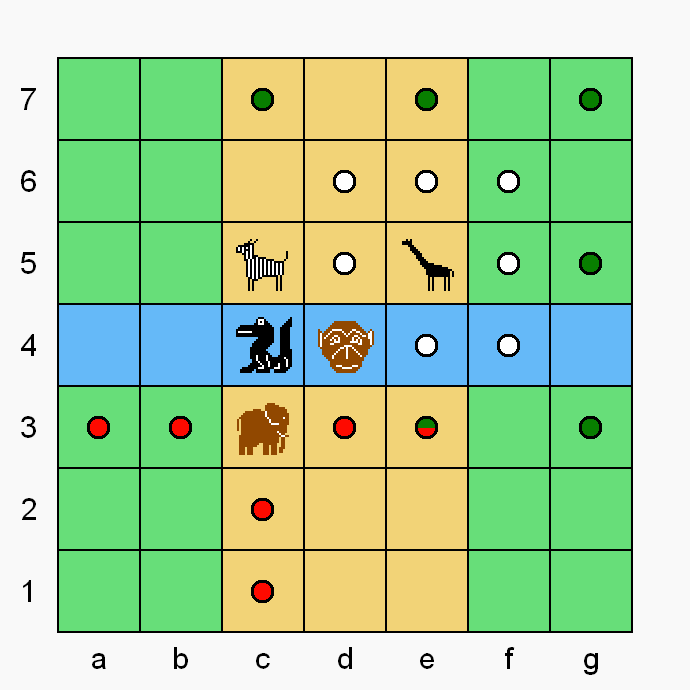
Brown's elephant can move or capture to any square containing a dot with red. Or it can capture Black's crocodile, or capture Black's zebra (jumping over the crocodile).
Black's giraffe can move (not capture) to any square with white dot, or it can move or capture to any square containing dot with dark green. It can capture Brown's elephant (jumping over Brown's monkey). It is blocked from moving to c5 due to Black's zebra, and is blocked from moving to d4 due to Brown's monkey.
Brown's monkey can capture Black's crocodile, then also Black's zebra, by jumping them in a multi-capture move. If Brown does not elect to stop on d6 but continues to jump Black's giraffe, all Black's pieces will be captured, but the monkey will end in the river a second time (square f4), sacrificing itself at end of turn.

== Endgame observations ==
- If only two lions remain, and neither can immediately capture the other, the game is a draw.
- A lion and any piece—even a pawn—wins against a bare lion, unless the bare lion can immediately capture the enemy lion.

== See also ==
- Chakra (chess variant)
- Jungle (board game)
