= Tobit (game) =

Draughts game

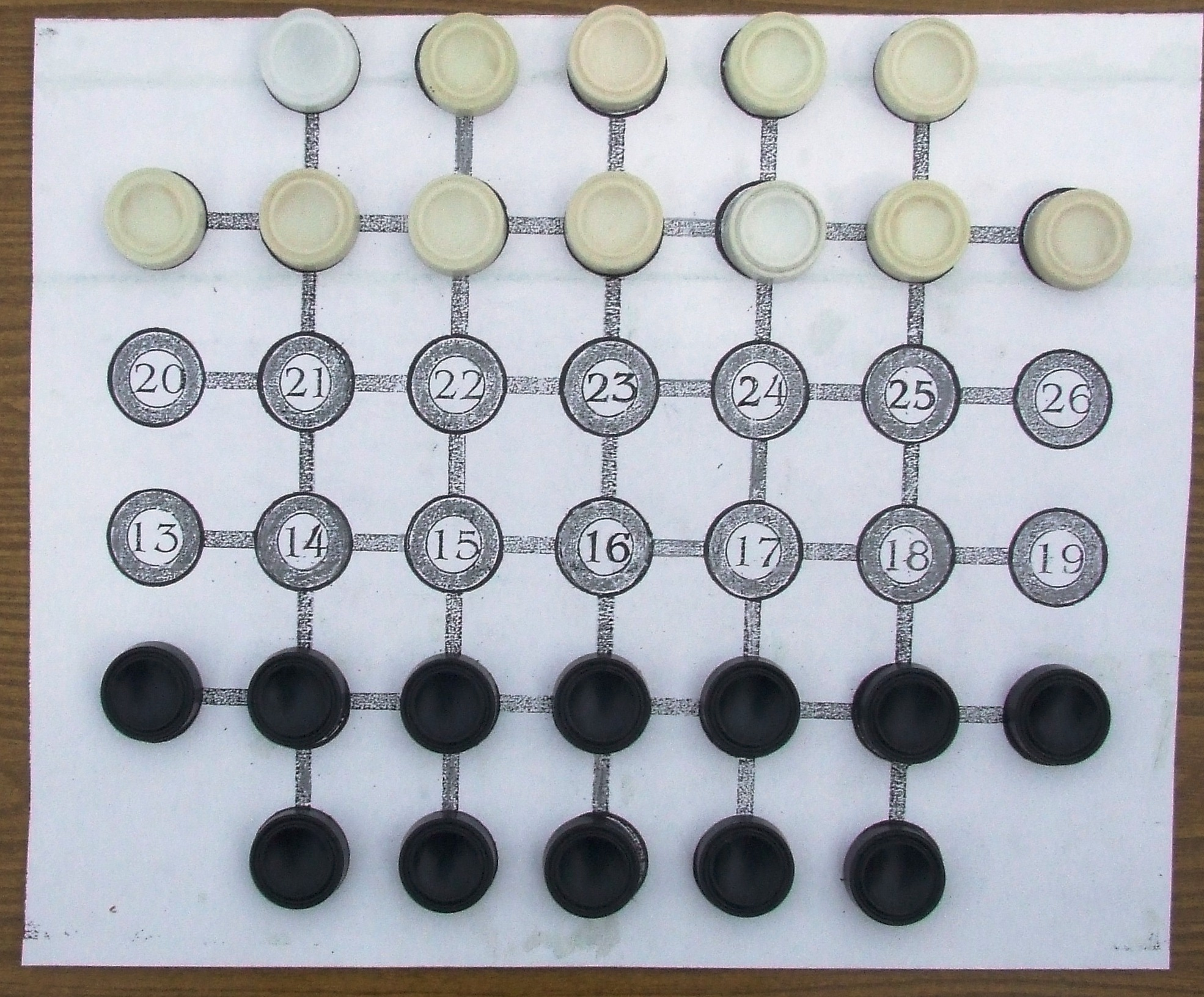
Tobit game

Tobit is a draughts game that resembles Turkish and Armenian draughts in that pieces move orthogonally (forward, sideways i.e. left and right). It especially resembles Turkish draughts in that pieces only move orthogonally.

== History ==
The game is played in the Republic of Khakassia of Russia, and is associated with the Khakas people. The history and etymology of the game is unclear. There are several variants as in different size boards and number of pieces, but the one described here has become the standard. In the past, the grid board was drawn on the ground with animal bones (such as sheep bones) used as playing pieces. The first competitions with the standard variant only began in 2002, and has grown significantly since then. Due to the game only having 38 spaces, the game is more tactical and less strategic compared to Turkish draughts.

== Rules ==
Tobit has a few distinguishing features. The game is played on a grid board and pieces are placed on the intersections and endpoints, whereas the other two games are played on a 8x8 square board and pieces are placed within the squares. The grid board is not a square or a rectangle. The grid board can be created by having four horizontal line segments intersect perpendicularly five vertical line segments, and these line segments continue beyond this crossing. The line segments are called "chols". The grid board has 20 intersection points and 18 endpoints thus creating a grid board of 38 points (spaces) which is smaller than the 64 squares (spaces) of Turkish draughts and Armenian draughts. The points on the board are numbered from 1 to 38. The crossing of the horizontal and vertical lines produces square spaces between them; a square space is called a "köl" or lake. These square spaces are a not a structural or functional component of the game, but it suggest how the Khakas people view this game.

Each player has 12 men or checkers or "hullar" ("hullar" is the plural form of "hul", and hul means servant) distinguishable from the other player (whereas each player has 16 men in Turkish draughts and Armenian draughts), and they are usually distinguished as white and black hul pieces. Each player's 12 hul pieces are initially placed in their respective first two ranks leaving only the two central rows vacant at the beginning of the game. The white hul pieces are placed on points 1 to 12, and the black hul pieces are placed on points 27 to 38. White moves first to begin the game. As in Turkish draughts, a hul may only move one step orthogonally forward or sideways (left or right) in a single turn. A hul promotes to a "tobit" (the equivalent of a king in draughts). When reaching the other player's first rank; specifically the endpoint of a vertical chol (vertical line segment) on the other player's side of the board. Since there are five vertical chols, then there are five endpoints in total where a hul can promote to become a tobit. The tobit may move any number of unoccupied steps forward, backward, or sideways (all four orthogonal directions) in a single turn.

A hul may capture an orthogonally adjacent opponent's hul or tobit (in any of the four orthogonal directions - forward, left, right, and backwards) using the short leap as in draughts. This is unlike Turkish or Armenian draughts where their non-promoted men are limited to captures made forward or sideways. A tobit may capture an opponent's hul or tobit in any of the four orthogonal directions like a flying king in Turkish or Armenian draughts. Opponent pieces may need not be adjacent to the tobit, but if the opponent piece is not adjacent, the path to it must be unoccupied; the tobit may land on any unoccupied point behind the opponent piece, so long as there are no obstructions between the capture piece and the space the tobit lands on. Captures are mandatory, therefore a hul or tobit must capture their opponent's hul or tobit if possible. A hul or tobit must continue capturing if it can in a single turn, hence more than one piece may be captured in a single turn. If more than one available sequence of captures is available, any one of them can be chosen as long as the player completes the chosen sequence of captures.

A player wins if he eliminates all of his opponent's pieces or blocks them so that they cannot perform a legal move or if the opponent resigns. The winning player receives 2 points while the losing player receives 0 points. A position repeated 3 times is cause for a draw.

== See also ==
- Draughts
- Armenian Draughts
- Turkish Draughts
- Dameo
- Keny
- Khakassia
