= Sygo =

Abstract strategy game

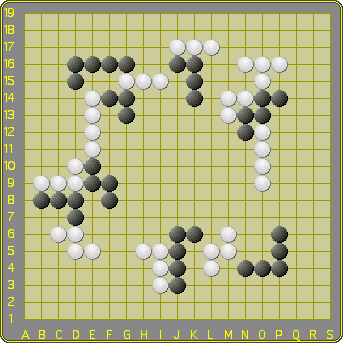
Sygo Mid-game

Sygo is a two player abstract strategy game created in 2010 by Christian Freeling. It is a variant of Go. Sygo is played on a 19x19 grid of lines. It differs from Go in that captured stones change colors instead of being removed from the board, similar to Reversi/Othello. Additionally, each turn, players may either place a new stone, or else grow all of their existing groups of stones by placing a new stone adjacent to each group, similar to Symple, another of Christian Freeling's games. The goal of Sygo is to control the most territory on the board as determined by the number of a player's stones on the board as well as empty points surrounded by the players stones. The game ends either when one player resigns or both players pass on successive turns.

== Rules ==
=== Movement ===
Each player has one of two color stones, black or white. The game set up starts with an empty board. Each turn a player may either:

1. Grow all of their groups of stones.
2. Put a stone on a vacant cell unconnected to any other friendly group.

A group is defined as any one or more stones connected orthogonally (up, down, left, or right) with no spaces in between. Groups are grown by placing a single stone orthogonally adjacent to any stone within a group. If a stone connects two or more different groups during a growth phase both groups are considered to have been grow by the single stone. Each group may only grow by one stone per turn. If two groups grow so that each of the two new stones touch to unite the two groups into one group, then the move is legal and does not count as growing a group twice in one turn.

White moves first. In order to mitigate any turn order advantage, if neither player has grown their groups, Black may grow all of his groups and place a single stone on any vacant square on the same turn. Moving is not compulsory and a player may pass his turn at any time.

=== Capture ===
Each stone or group has what are called liberties. A liberty is a vacant point orthogonally adjacent to a stone. When a stone or group loses all its liberties by being "surrounded" by an opponent's stones, all the stones in that group are captured. In Sygo, capturing a stone means reversing their color and making them the capturing player's own rather than removing them from the board. If the placement of a stone results in the player's own group losing all its liberties then the move is referred to as "suicide" and is illegal. Another move must be chosen or the player must pass their turn.

Because of Sygo's capture protocol, certain gameplay elements found in Go such as Ko and snap-back do not occur in Sygo.

=== Scoring ===
When one player resigns, or both players pass their turns successively, Sygo ends and the game is scored. A player's score is determined by the number of their stones on the board as well as the vacant points entirely surrounded by their stones.

Unlike Go, there is no Komi to compensate for a second player disadvantage.

== Trivia ==
- Sygo can be played online against the AiAi program.
- Designer Christian Freeling calls Sygo "Go on speed," as the group growing mechanic causes the game to end in fewer turns than Go.
- Sygo has a game complexity of ~10^540.

== See also ==
- Symple
