= Turkish draughts =

Variant of draughts played in the Mediterranean and Middle East

Turkish draughts board and starting setup. White moves first.

Turkish draughts (Turkish: dama, Armenian: շաշկի, տամա, Arabic: دامە, Kurmanji Kurdish: dame) is a variant of draughts (checkers) played in Turkey, Greece, Egypt, Kuwait, Lebanon, Syria, Jordan, and several other locations around the Mediterranean Sea and Middle East.

== Rules ==
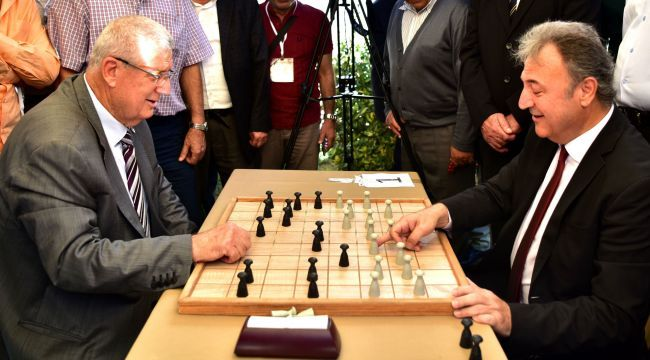
At the opening of the "Bornova International Turkish Checkers Tournament", Mayor Dr. Mustafa İduğ and Aegean Checkers Association President Murat Keser

On an 8×8 board, 16 men are lined up on each side, in two rows. The back rows are vacant. A traditional Turkish draughts gameboard is mono-coloured. White moves first.

Men move orthogonally forwards or sideways one square, capturing by means of a jump; they cannot move or capture backwards or diagonally. When a man reaches the back row, it promotes to a king. Kings can move any number of empty squares orthogonally forwards, backwards or sideways. A king captures by jumping over a single piece any number of empty squares away, landing on any open square beyond the captured piece along a straight line.

If a jump is available it must be taken. If there is more than one way to jump, the one capturing the most number of pieces must be taken. If there is more than one way to capture the maximum number of pieces, the player may choose. Within a multicapture, a king is not allowed to turn 180 degrees between two captures. Pieces are removed from the board immediately after being jumped. There is no distinction between king and man during captures; each counts as a piece.

A player wins if the opponent has no legal move, either because all his pieces are captured or he is completely blocked. Murray mentions a Dama variant where the king versus single man leads to the king's holder winning. He owes this rule to the Palestinian player, Hilmi Samara, but it is conventional among Dama players that a king versus a single man results in a draw.

=== Observations ===
- Unlike other draughts variants, since pieces in a multicapture are removed immediately after being jumped and before the captor continues jumping, as pieces are captured and removed, it is possible to cross a square previously occupied by a captured piece more than once, which can open up additional jumps previously impossible.
- Without the rule whereby a player wins in the case of king versus a single man, the player owning the man could avoid capture indefinitely.

== Turkish Draughts World championships ==
Since 2014, World Championships have taken place annually. The first official Turkish Draughts World Championships were held 22–24 October 2014 in İzmir, Turkey. The second championships were also held in İzmir, with the third in Doha, Qatar. The first Women's Turkish Draughts World Championships took place in İzmir during May 2016.

1. 2014 İzmir
2. 2015 Doha
3. 2016 İzmir

== Variants ==
=== Armenian draughts ===
Armenian draughts, also known as Tama, is a variant of Turkish draughts that adds diagonal movement to the game. Men are able to move one space diagonally forwards in addition to the straight forwards and side to side movement of men in Turkish draughts. Kings are able to move in all 8 directions, like a queen in chess. All captures are orthogonal only, as in Turkish draughts.

=== Keny ===
Keny is a variant of Turkish draughts that adds backwards capture to the game, and allows men to jump over friendly pieces like a capture as long as there is an empty space available. The jumped friendly pieces are not captured.

=== Croda ===
Croda is a variant invented by a Croatian mathematics professor, and international draughts champion, Ljuban Dedić. It removes the sideways movement of men and replaces it with diagonally forwards movements. It also fills the back ranks with men, and requires that pieces be removed at the end of the turn rather than during each capture.

=== Dameo ===
Dameo is a variant invented by Dutch games designer Christian Freeling. It removes the sideways movement of men, like Croda, and adds linear movement, which allows a whole line of men to move together in a single direction. The opening set up is different as well with 18 men arranged in a trapezoid pattern that prevents build-up of men along the sides of the board. The king moves as the king in Armenian draughts.

== Trivia ==
- Dama was the core inspiration for the games Dameo and Croda.
- In Dama, two friendly kings always beat a lone enemy king under skillful play. In contrast, four friendly kings are needed to defeat a lone enemy king in international draughts.
- Dama has a much lower draw rate than English draughts or international draughts.

== See also ==
- Abstract strategy games
- Dameo
- Draughts
- Tobit
