= Hexdame =

Draughts game on a hexagonal board

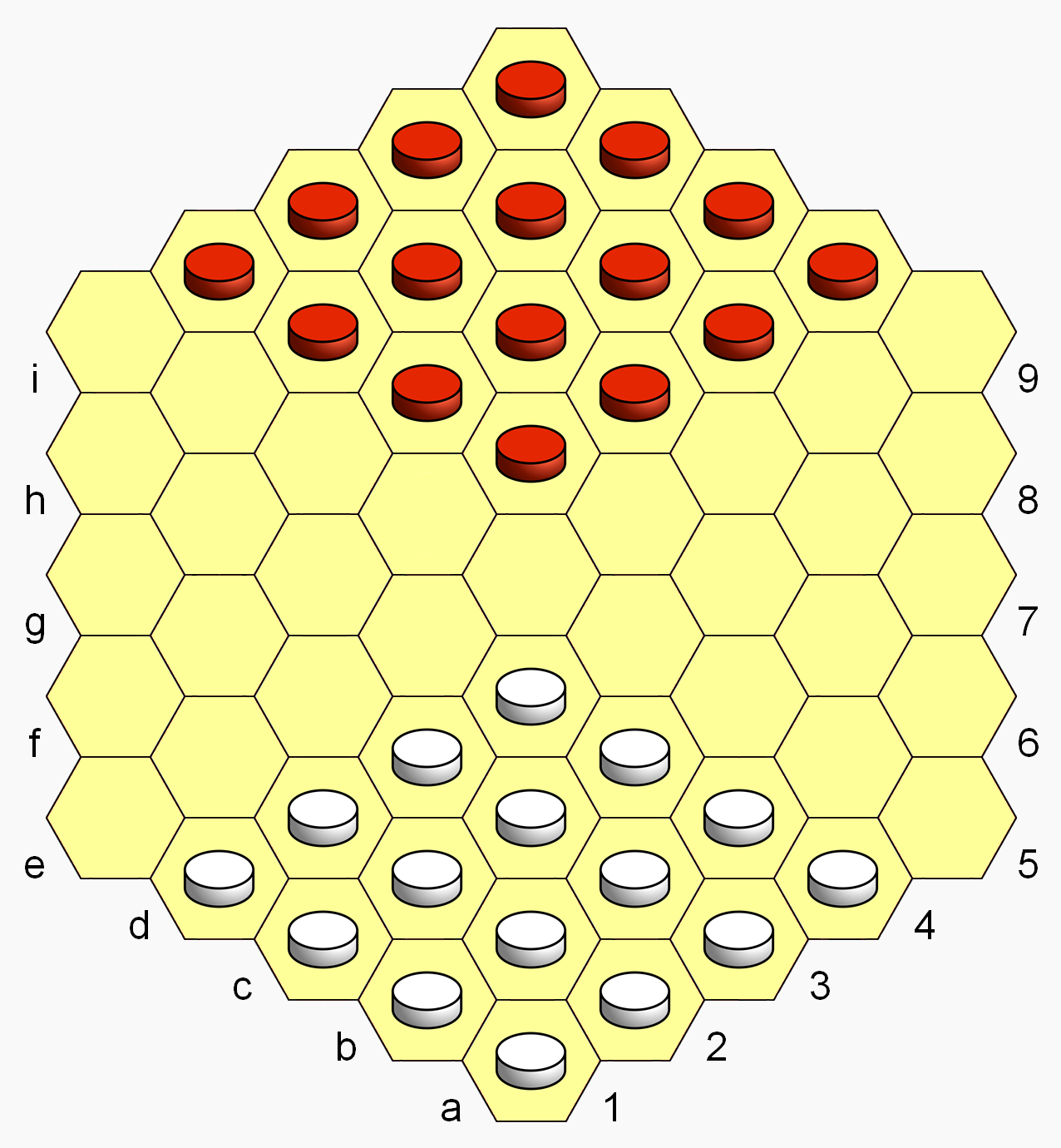
Hexdame gameboard and starting position. White moves first.

Hexdame (or HexDame) is a strategy board game for two players invented by Christian Freeling in 1979. The game is a literal adaptation of the game international draughts (checkers or Dame (Note: In most non-English languages, draughts is called dames or a similar term that refers to ladies. (For more background on word dames, see Draughts#Naming.))) to a hexagonal gameboard.

== Game overview ==
The Hexdame board is a regular hexagon consisting of 61 cells, with each player having 16 men in the initial setup as shown. A man can move forward one step to an adjacent empty cell (three directions for moving), or can capture an enemy piece on an adjacent cell by jumping in the same line to the empty cell immediately beyond it (six directions for capturing). A king's movement and jumping are along rows of adjacent hex cells (six directions – two vertical and four oblique).

Other than the above, the rules for Hexdame can be taken directly from those for international draughts (checkers). For convenience, these have been summarized below. (Else see International draughts#Rules.)

=== Summary of international draughts rules ===
- White moves first, then moves alternate; a player may not pass (skip) a turn.
- Men move forwards (not backwards). If a man reaches the last row of the board (the row nearest his opponent) at the conclusion of a move, it promotes to king; the promoted man is crowned for identification as king by placing a second checker of the same colour on top.
- Jumping (capturing) is mandatory, including making multiple jumps if available. If there are jumping options, the player must always select the option that captures the maximum number of the opponent's pieces (men or kings); if two options capture the same number, the player may choose.
- A multi-jump can consist of single jumps having a combination of different directions.
- Pieces jumped in a multi-jump are removed from the board only after the jumping move is complete.
- A king can make a flying king move (move any number of contiguous empty cells) or capture (capture a piece any number of empty cells' distance away).
- When a king jumps, it may land on any empty cell beyond the jumped piece. (Unless there is a requirement to land on a particular cell, in order to continue jumping according to the rule mandating that all jumps capture maximum pieces.)
- During a multi-jump, a piece may not be jumped more than once. (Empty cells, however, may be visited or jumped any number of times.)
- A player whose pieces all become captured, or is unable to make a legal move, loses the game.
- If the players agree, or if the same position repeats three times with the same player having the move, the game is a draw.

== Strategy differences ==
Though Hexdame precisely mirrors the rules of international draughts, the hex board geometry introduces important differences in play dynamic:

- Greater complexity, since men have three directions for moving forward, instead of two; and kings have six directions of movement, instead of four on the 10×10 board.
- A single man cannot thwart an opponent's man from advancing through the threat of being jumped, as it can in international draughts, since the opponent will always have another option for moving forward.
- Each side has nine possible promotion cells on the hex board (versus five on the 10×10 orthogonal board).
- Draws are fewer, since three kings defeat one king in Hexdame. (Three kings versus one in international draughts is a declaration of draw; four are usually needed.)

== See also ==
- Dameo – another draughts variant by Christian Freeling
