= Symple (game) =

Abstract strategy game

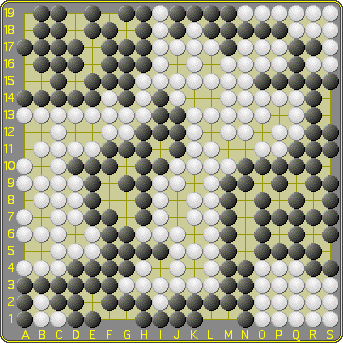
Game between Christian Freeling and Ed van Zon

Symple is a two-player abstract strategy game created in 2010 by Christian Freeling and Benedikt Rosenau. The goal of Symple is to end the game with the highest score, with score being determined via points for controlling territory on the board less a penalty for each separate group of stones. Like Go, Symple is played on a 19x19 grid of lines; unlike Go, there are no mechanics allowing capture of stones once placed. Symple is a drawless finite perfect information game.

== Rules ==
=== Movement ===
Each player has one of two color stones, one darker and one lighter, often black and white. The game set up starts with an empty board. Each turn a player must either:

1. Grow all of their groups of stones.
2. Put a stone on a vacant cell unconnected to any other friendly group.

A group is defined as any one or more stones connected orthogonally (up, down, left, or right) with no spaces in between. Groups are grown by placing a single stone on a space orthogonally adjacent to any stone within a group. Each group may only grow by one stone per turn. If a stone connects two or more different groups during a growth phase both groups are considered to have been grown by the single stone. If two groups grow so that each of the two new stones touch to unite the two groups into one group, then the move is legal and does not count as growing a group twice in one turn.

The lighter color moves first. In order to mitigate turn order advantage, if neither player has grown their groups, the second player may grow all of his groups and place a single stone on any vacant square on the same turn. Moving is compulsory and a player may not pass his turn at any time.

=== Scoring ===
Symple ends when one player resigns or when the game board is full. A player's score is determined by the number of their stones on the board as minus X number of points for every separate group, where X is an even number agreed on beforehand.

== History ==
Symple had its origins in a conversation between Benedikt Rosenau and Christian Freeling over email discussing the star family of connection games (Star, Superstar, *Star, and YvY). Rosenau noticed that each of these games awarded points for "taking certain fields and imposing a tax [on groups of connected pieces]…" and was looking for a generalized version of this concept. He was, in his words "...at the limit of design without heavy playtesting. I cannot achieve what I want." Christian Freeling initially was uninterested in the concept and filed it away for later use and said "I'll put it where I did put the idea of linear movement in Draughts, after inventing Bushka. Might take 15 years though."

Despite his initial skepticism, however, Freeling ended up thinking about a generalized version of the gameplay mechanic all the same. He claims that just as he was going to sleep "...Symple came rising up, and the last thing I remember thinking was: '... so simple? what's wrong ...?'"

This first version differed from the present game in a number of ways. Freeling initially conceived of Symple as being played on a hexagon board. The move protocol was also notably different. A player was not required to make any move at all, and instead of choosing between placing a stone down and making a new group or growing all existing groups by one, a player could choose one or both options.

He sent the concept to Rosenau who was an enthusiastic supporter of the idea, although he misunderstood the concept to Symple's benefit. He read the rules as giving the player an either or choice between passing, and choosing one of the two options, but not both. This misreading ended becoming the core dilemma of the game, choosing between placing a stone in the hopes of later growth, and growing all existing groups for immediate growth.

The only two loose ends were the board configuration and deciding on a balancing rule against first player advantage. Freeling decided that the square grid was better suited to the game than a hex grid and changed it, while Freeling and Rosenau's joint examination of the Pie rule for balancing established that it wasn't effective. The move protocol of Symple serves as a built in pie rule allowing for a natural balance. They settled on allowing the second player to grow all of their groups as well as place a single stone if neither player has grown any groups.

Eventually a final "flaw" in Symple was noticed. The rule that allowed players to pass on their turns caused problems with cooperative drawing in competitive play. This was pointed out to Freeling by Luis Bolaños Mures, creator of Ayu, and Keil, after he noticed several players passing their turns during game play. He sought clarification of the rules due to what he thought was an allowance of "trivial draws." After this conversation Freeling decided to change the rule wording from saying players "...may.." to players "...must..." place a single stone on the board or grow all their groups.

== Strategy ==
The main dilemma is to figure out how to balance laying stones down versus growing them. Laying down stones allows for more growth later by creating more groups capable of growing, but growing offers immediate return. More groups grow faster than less groups, but if an opponent finds the right balance of group number to early growth they can begin to outpace you and control the board even with less groups growing. There's also the possibility that the opponent who grows early can cut off your groups and force you to accept the group penalty at the end of the game.

Christian Freeling and Benedikt Rosenau consider move 12 to be a generally useful turn to begin shifting from placing down stones to growing, but it may be useful to switch sooner or later as strategies are more carefully analyzed.

Ideally the opening stones should be placed to be able to secure as much territory for future growth. Controlling the edges of the board is generally useful, but one or two "anchor stones" in the center are also advantageous. Keeping groups disconnected is important in the early game because it maximizes growth potential.

In the endgame, when growth potential is reduced, opportunities arise to cut off the opponent's groups or connect the player's own groups (to eliminate group penalties at the end of the game.) Additionally, during the final turns, it is possible to attempt to intentionally keep small empty areas within one's territory; since players are forced to create a new group if they cannot grow, this can be a way to force the other player to make a worthless invasion group for which the per-group penalty will be larger than whatever score is gained by creating the group.

== Trivia ==
- Symple can be played online against the AiAi program.
- Symple has a game tree complexity of ~10^208.
- Symple was selected for the 2013 Codecup Challenge. Contestants had to create a program that could play the game and then compete against each other. The winner was Abdessamad Elkasimi.

== See also ==
- Sygo
