= Checkers Federation of Armenia =

Sports organization of Armenia

Checkers Federation of Armenia logo

The Checkers Federation of Armenia (Armenian: Հայաստանի շաշկի ֆեդերացիա), also known as the Armenian Draughts Federation, is the regulating body of checkers (also known as draughts) in Armenia, governed by the Armenian Olympic Committee. The headquarters of the federation is located in Yerevan.

== History ==
The Checkers Federation of Armenia is currently led by president Albert Poghosyan. The Federation oversees the training of checkers specialists and organizes Armenia's participation in European and international draughts/checkers competitions. In November 2019, the Federation hosted the Checkers World Cup in Armenia. The Federation also organizes national tournaments and youth training/championships. The Federation is a full member of the World Draughts Federation, within the "European Division".

== See also ==
- Armenian draughts
- Chess Federation of Armenia
- Chess in Armenia
- Sport in Armenia
