= Armenian draughts =

	1		2		3		4
5		6		7		8
	9		10		11		12
13		14		15		16
	17		18		19		20
21		22		23		24
	25		26		27		28
29		30		31		32

Armenian Draughts Starting Position

Armenian draughts, or Tama, is a variant of draughts (or checkers) played in Armenia. The rules are similar to Dama. Armenian draughts, however, allows for diagonal movement.

== Rules ==
On an 8×8 board, 16 men are lined up on each side in two rows, skipping the first and last row. From a player's point of view, the second and third rows are filled with men of his own color, and the sixth and seventh rows are filled with the opponent's men.

Players alternate turns with each making one move per turn. Pieces initially consist of men only. When reaching the opposite side of the board, men are "crowned" to pieces called kings.

A man can move forwards, straight ahead or diagonally, or sideways to an orthogonally adjacent field if that field is empty. Kings may move in all directions (up, down, left, right, or diagonally), as long as the path is clear of pieces. In other words, the king moves like a Chess queen.

If a man is orthogonally adjacent to an opponent's man, and there is an empty field one square beyond, it may capture the opponent's man by leaping into the empty space (left, right, or forwards). There is no backward or diagonal capture for men.

Kings may capture by jumping over a piece and landing in any field beyond the piece captured, as long as it is not blocked by another piece. Kings may not capture diagonally.

Multiple captures are allowed, and required where possible, for men and kings alike. If, when landing on an empty field after capturing an opponent's man, there is another capture possible, it must be taken immediately. If there are multiples different opportunities for capture, the one which takes the most pieces is mandatory (no distinction between kings and men is made). If there are several opportunities for capture that fulfill the maximum capture rule, the player may choose which to take. Pieces are removed during capture rather than at the end of the move, which means a capture may be "opened up" mid-move by capturing a different piece earlier in the move.

The game ends when one player cannot move their pieces, either because they have been hemmed in and cannot make a legal move, or because all of their pieces were captured.

== See also ==
- Checkers Federation of Armenia
- Dameo
- Keny
- Tobit
