= Fanorona =

Board game from Madagascar

- Fanorona starting setup
- Genres: Board game Abstract strategy game
- Players: 2
- Chance: None
- Skills: Strategy, tactics

Fanorona (Malagasy pronunciation: [fə̥ˈnurnə̥]) is a strategy board game for two players. The game is indigenous to Madagascar.

== Rules ==
Fanorona has three standard versions: Fanoron-Telo, Fanoron-Dimy, and Fanoron-Sivy. The difference between these variants is the size of board. Fanoron-Telo is played on a 3×3 board and the difficulty can be compared to the game of Tic-tac-toe. Fanoron-Dimy is played on a 5×5 board and Fanoron-Sivy is played on a 9×5 board—Sivy being the most popular. The Sivy board consists of lines and intersections that create a grid with five rows and nine columns subdivided diagonally to form part of the tetrakis square tiling of the plane. A line represents the path where a stone can move during the game. There are weak and strong intersections. At a weak intersection, it is only possible to move a stone horizontally and vertically, while on a strong intersection, it is also possible to move a stone diagonally. A stone can only move from one intersection to an adjacent intersection. Black and white pieces, twenty-two each, are arranged on all points except the center. The objective of the game is to capture all the opponents pieces. The game is a draw if neither player succeeds in this.

Players alternate turns, starting with White.

- There are two kinds of moves: non-capturing and capturing. A non-capturing move is called a paika move.
- A paika move consists of moving one stone along a line to an adjacent intersection.
- Capturing moves are obligatory and have to be played in preference to paika moves.
- Capturing implies removing one or more pieces of the opponent, in one of two ways:
  - Approach—moving the capturing stone to a point adjacent to an opponent's stone, which must be on the continuation of the capturing stone's movement line.
  - Withdrawal—the capturing stone moves from a point adjacent to the opponent's stone, away from the stone along the continuation of the line between them.
- When an opponent stone is captured, all opponent pieces in line beyond that stone (as long as there is no interruption by an empty point or an own stone) are captured as well.
- An approach capture and a withdrawal capture cannot be made at the same time – the player must choose one or the other.
- As in checkers, the capturing piece is allowed to continue making successive captures, with these restrictions:
  - The piece is not allowed to arrive at the same position twice.
  - It is not permitted to move twice consecutively in the same direction (first to make a withdrawal capture, and then to make an approach capture) as part of a capturing sequence.
- However, unlike in checkers, continuing the capturing sequence is optional.
- The game ends when one player captures all stones of the opponent. If neither player can achieve this—for instance if the game reaches a state where neither player can attack the other without overly weakening their own position—then the game is a draw.

== History ==
Fanorona is widely played in Madagascar. According to one version of a popular legend, an astrologer had advised King Ralambo to choose his successor by, while his sons were away from the capital, feigning sickness and urging their return; his kingdom would be given to the first son who returned home to him. When the king's messenger reached Ralambo's elder son Prince Andriantompokoindrindra, he was playing fanorona and trying to win a particularly difficult telo noho dimy (3 against 5) situation. As a result, his younger brother Prince Andrianjaka was the first to arrive and inherited the throne.

Fanorona inspired Christian Freeling's draughts variant Bushka, which in turn inspired the game Dameo.

== Analysis ==
Using 10,000 games with Alpha-beta pruning players, the game-tree complexity and state-space complexity can be computed. Fanorona has a game-tree complexity of ~10^{46} and a state-space complexity of ~10^{21}.

In 2007, the game of Fanorona and smaller variants were solved weakly as a draw under perfect play. Both the moves f2-e3A and d3-e3A lead to a draw.

== See also ==
- Kōnane
