= Pasang (game) =

Board game from Brunei

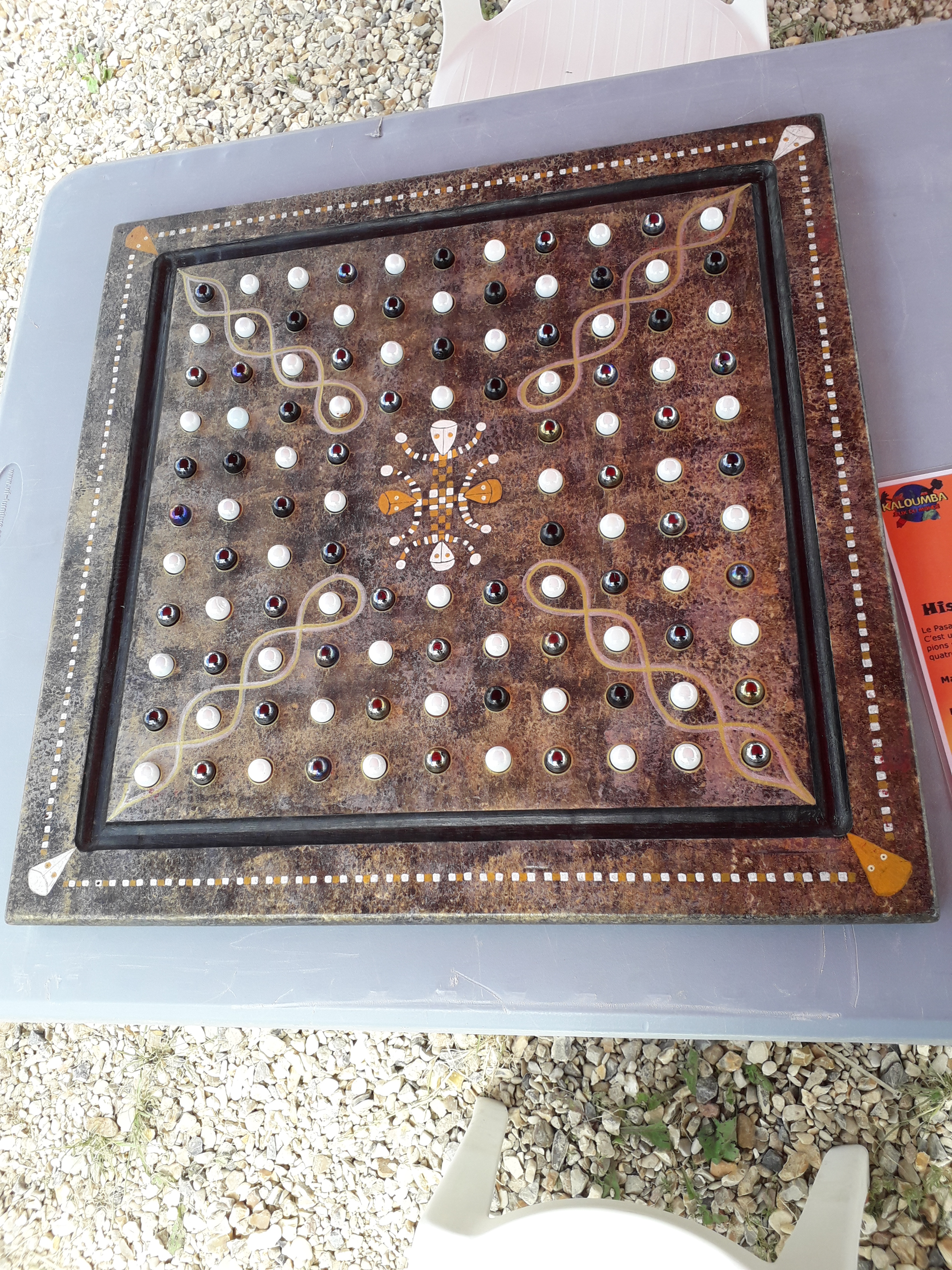
Game of pasang displayed in a gaming festival in Paris, France.

Pasang is a two-player abstract strategy board game from Brunei. The game is often referred to as Pasang Emas which is actually a software implementation of the traditional board game. The object of this game is to acquire the most points by capturing black and white tokens on the board. Black tokens are worth 1 point, and white tokens are worth 2 points. The board is initially laid out with all 120 black and white tokens in one of over 30 traditional patterns. Players choose a piece called a "ka" which is used to capture the tokens on the board. Each player's "ka" moves around the board capturing as many tokens as possible As a note, the "kas" are the only mobile pieces in the game. The other pieces are stationary, and are captured by the "kas". Players must capture token(s) during their turn, or lose the game. When all tokens have been captured from the board, the player with the most points is the winner. However, if there are any tokens left on the board, and none can be captured on a player's turn, then that player loses the game, and the other player is the winner.

The game is divided into three phases each with its own rules of capture. All three capturing methods are perhaps unique to Pasang. In the first phase, each player must choose a column of tokens to capture on their side of the board. The empty column left on the board is called a "passage". For the second phase, each player chooses a "ka" from among the tokens next to the passage, or tokens one column away from the passage whichever method both players agree upon. The "ka" then enters the passage and captures any odd number of tokens of the same color that it forms a line with from any orthogonal direction. From there on (third phase), each player's "ka" moves any number of vacant spaces in an orthogonal direction provided it can capture an odd number of tokens of the same color. However, the "ka" at this phase of the game captures tokens differently. If the "ka" is moving vertically (up and down), it can only capture tokens in a horizontal direction that it forms a line with. Likewise, if the "ka" moves horizontally (left and right), then it can only capture tokens in a vertical direction that it forms a line with.

The game is unrelated to any other board game. It is perhaps remotely related to Fanorona. Its resemblance to Fanorona is that several pieces are captured in a particular line, and the pieces cover most of the board in the beginning. There is also a rule in the second and third phase, that an odd number of pieces must be captured reminiscent of the capturing rule in Rimau.

Stewart Culin in his book "Chess and Playing Cards: Catalogue of Games and Implements for Divination" (1898) describes a Malaysian game called Chuki (on pages 871-873) whose board resembles that of Pasang's. The board (called papan chuki) is described as a square board of ten squares in length on both sides which makes for a grid of 11 in length on both sides (an 11 x 11 square grid which equates to 121 intersection points) when the pieces are played on the intersection points instead, and this is depicted on Figure 175 on page 871 where the game pieces (all 120 of them) are situated on the intersection points and not within the squares. Only one intersection point is not occupied by a game piece, and that is the central point of the board which is occupied by a small raised square (called a "tempat mangkok" which translates to "place of bowl") much like that of Pasang. Moreover, there are 60 white pieces and 60 black pieces in Chuki similarly as in Pasang. Due to the bowl (represented by a relatively large white circle) occupying the central point, the four orthogonal line segments next to the central point are omitted from the board on Figure 175; and on Figure 174 which depicts a table game board version of Chuki, the square bowl blocks the central point and the four line segments next to it. Therefore, both figures of Chuki show that the central point of the board and the four line segments next to it are not playable just like in Pasang. Chuki's rules as described by Culin appears to be a different game from Pasang as it uses three dices which are thrown into the bowl, and the game pieces of the thrower are removed from the board according to the result of the cast. In Pasang there are no dices used, and the cup or bowl has no function in the game as it is used only to store the game pieces. Other descriptions of Chuki which were written as footnotes by other writers on page 872, describe a game called Chuke or Juki as a game resembling draughts, and this was from an 1852 Malay and English dictionary (pages 39, 62) by Crawford. An earlier account in 1835 describes Chuki or Tjoeki as resembling checkers with a 120 small squares with 60 black and 60 white pieces (1835, Roorda van Eysinga, Algemeen Javaansch en Nederduitsch woordenboek, p. 662.). There are other footnotes saying that Tjuki resembles draughts played with white and black beans.

== Goal ==
When all the pieces on the board have been captured, the player that has acquired the most points is the winner. However, if there are any pieces left on the board, then the player who could not perform their last turn is the loser, and the other player is the winner.

== Equipment ==
The board is an 11 x 11 square grid (or a 10 x 10 square board) with pieces played on the intersection points. A 2 x 2 empty square is made in the middle of the board. To be more specific, the middle point of the board is removed along with the four segments connected to it. Also, four diagonal lines from the four corners of the board connect to the four corners of the 2 x 2 empty square. The diagonal lines have no structural relevance to the game, they are just an aid in setting up the pieces on the board in one of over thirty possible patterns. In this article, only two patterns are described. There is a total of 120 intersection points for the pieces to be played upon.

Each player has 60 pieces. One plays the black pieces, and the other plays the white pieces, however any two colors will suffice. The game pieces are traditionally stored in a cup or bowl (called a "gadong")which sits on the central point of the board.

== Gameplay and rules ==
1. In the beginning, the board is laid out with all 120 pieces on the 120 intersection points in one of two patterns. Players must agree on which pattern to lay out the pieces on the board. Please see the first link below under the External Links section for a better visual description of the two possible patterns.

The first pattern is described as the following: Let w = white piece, b = black piece, _ = empty (only found on the sixth row)

a) First row (or Top row): wwwwwbbbbbw; b) Second row: bwwwwbbbbww; c) Third row: bbwwwbbbwww; d) Fourth row: bbbwwbbwwww; e) Fifth row: bbbbwbwwwww; f) Sixth row: bbbbb_bbbbb; g) Seventh row: wwwwwbwbbbb; h) Eighth row: wwwwbbwwbbb; i) Ninth row: wwwbbbwwwbb; j) Tenth row: wwbbbbwwwwb; k) Eleventh row: wbbbbbwwwww

The second pattern is described as the following: Let w = white piece, b = black piece, _ = empty (only found on the sixth row)

a) First row (or Top row): bwwbbwwbwbb; b) Second row: bbwwbbwwbbw; c) Third row: wbbwwbbwbww; d) Fourth row: bwwbwwbbwwb; e) Fifth row: wwbbbwbwwbb; f) Sixth row: wbbww_wwbbw; g) Seventh row: bbwwbwbbbww; h) Eighth row: bwwbbwwbwwb; i) Ninth row: wwbwbbwwbbw; j) Tenth row: wbbwwbbwwbb; k) Eleventh row: bbwwwwbbwwb

2. Once the pattern is agreed upon, and the pieces are laid out on the board accordingly, players then decide who will start first.

3. Players alternate their turns throughout the game. Only one move per turn, and each move is a capture.

4. Each black piece captured is worth 1 point, and each white piece captured is worth 2 points.

First Phase:

5. For their first move, each player must choose a 5-piece column to capture on their respective half of the board. The first player captures first, and has eleven possible columns to choose from their side. The captured column of pieces are removed from the board, and kept by the first player to be scored. Captured pieces are never brought back into the game. This is the first capture for the first player. The empty column left on the board is called a "passage".

6. The second player then chooses their 5 piece column to capture, but is dependent upon which quadrant the first player had chosen their 5 piece column: a) If the first player had chosen a five-piece column on the lower left quadrant of the board, then the second player must choose a five-piece column on the diagonally opposite quadrant of the board, and in this case it is the upper right quadrant; b) similarly if, on the other hand, the first player had chosen a five-piece column on the lower right quadrant of the board, then the second player must choose a five-piece column on the upper left quadrant of the board; c) if, however, the first player had chosen the five-piece column in the middle of the board, then the second player can choose from any column on their half of the board with the exception of their middle column. The second player captures the column, and removes the pieces from the board which are kept by him or her to be scored.

Second Phase:

7. Each player must now choose a "ka". A "ka" is one piece that will be used throughout the rest of the game by the player to capture pieces on the board. No other piece is used by the player. The chosen "ka" can be of any color. Although the "ka" will either be black or white, the "ka" must be viewed as a non-colored piece. This concept is important with regards to capturing pieces as will be further described.

8. There are two ways to choose a "ka". Players must agree on which method the "ka" is to be chosen. One method (called the "sliding play") is to choose a piece from a 5-piece column adjacent to the passage the player had created. A second method (called the "jumping play") is to choose a piece from a 5-piece column that is one column removed from the passage (i.e. there is at least one column between it and the passage).

9. If the sliding play is chosen, the "ka" then slides horizontally (one space) into the passage, and captures piece(s) from that intersection point that it moved to in the passage. The possible pieces that the "ka" can capture are those that are in the same row nearest to the "ka", or in the same column nearest to the "ka". Captured piece(s) must belong in a row, or in a column, but not both; moreover, the piece(s) captured must be of the same color (i.e. monochrome - either white or black, but not both), and there must be an odd number of pieces (e.g. 1, 3, 5, etc.) excluding the "ka". Remember, the "ka" no longer represents any color, and is essentially a non-colored piece. The "ka" and the odd number of monochrome pieces must form a line in a row or column uninterrupted by the other colored piece(s) or by the other player's "ka". The "ka" and the monochrome piece(s) can be separated from each other with empty spaces; furthermore, the "ka" can be in any position in this line with the monochrome pieces.

If more than one capturing line is formed, then the player must choose one and only one to capture.

A special note to mention are those two orthogonal lines (one horizontal and one vertical) that run down the center of the board and are interrupted by the empty 2 x 2 square in the middle of the board. Those two lines are not continuous through the empty 2 x 2 square. Therefore, a "ka" cannot form a capturing line with pieces on the other side of the empty 2 x 2 square in either of those two orthogonal lines.

10. If the jumping play is chosen, the "ka" jumps horizontally over the column next to the passage, and lands in the passage. From here on, game play and rules are the same as described in #9.

Note that #7, #8, #9, and #10 described the second move by each player.

Third Phase:

11. After the second move, each player may move its "ka" orthogonally any number of unoccupied spaces as long it can capture. Remember, every move must be a capturing move. However, the capturing method for the rest of the game is slightly different. A "ka" that moves horizontally (in a row) can only capture vertically (pieces on a column), and vice versa, a "ka" that moves vertically (in a column) can only capture horizontally (pieces on a row). Therefore, a "ka" that moves horizontally must land on a space that it can capture vertically, and vice versa, a "ka" that moves vertically must land on a space that it can capture horizontally. It is only in the second move that a "ka" can move into a space and capture in either the horizontal or vertical direction.

12. If all the pieces on the board are captured, then the player with the most points wins the game. The point totals for each player is the score for that game. However, if the game can no longer progress because one player can no longer perform a capturing move (a situation called a "suntuk"), then that player is the loser, and the other player is the winner. The point total for this game is 120 - 0 in favor of the winner.

== Related games ==
- Fanorona
