= Christian Freeling =

Dutch game designer (1947–2026)

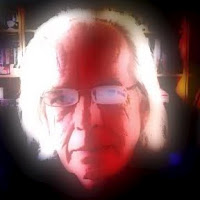
- Freeling in 2012
- Born: 1 February 1947; Enschede, Netherlands
- Died: 19 May 2026 (aged 79); Enschede, Netherlands
- Occupation: Mathematics teacher
- Known for: Game designer
- Children: 4
- Website: https://mindsports.nl/

Christian Freeling (1 February 1947 – 19 May 2026) was a Dutch game designer and inventor of abstract strategy games, notably Dameo, Grand Chess, Havannah, and Hexdame.

Freeling's designs cover a range of game types. Several of his games are endeavors to improve on established games that he concluded are flawed or limited in some way, while some introduce familiar game mechanics into uncommon settings. He also regularly translated rules for orthogonal board games to the hexagonal grid, resulting in new versions with altered properties – usually enhanced strategy and tactics options, and fewer draws.

Among all his games, Freeling considered Dameo, Emergo, Grand Chess, Storisende, Sygo, and Symple to be his most important, with Emergo as his personal favourite. In Abstract Games (2002), Kerry Handscomb described Freeling's games as "often embody[ing] a desire to get to the heart of the concepts used in abstract games [...] most clearly displayed by his minimalist chess variant, Chad, and his version of column checkers, Emergo".

== Notable games ==
Dameo is a draughts/checkers variant inspired by International draughts and a variant of Turkish draughts called Croda invented by Ljuban Dedić. Dameo utilizes all 64 squares of the checkerboard and uses both orthogonal and diagonal movement, although capture is orthogonal only. It also introduces linear movement of men where lines of men of any length may move forward together, similar to Epaminondas or Bushka. This was added to speed play, enhance tactics, and curtail draws. "Considerable work has already gone into analyzing Dameo, and some remarkable discoveries have been made in the area of endgame positions with just a few pieces left."

Grand Chess utilizes the same compound pieces (Note: The marshall combines a chess rook and chess knight; the cardinal combines a bishop and knight.) as Capablanca Chess, but the starting setup connects the rooks, giving immediate freedom of movement and "yields the better game" (Schmittberger 1992:206). Internet Grand Chess World Championships have been held, and NOST (Note: NOST (kNights of the Square Table), a (now defunct) correspondence game club formed in 1960 by Bob Lauzon and Jim France, enjoyed several hundred active members (Pritchard 1994:210).) sponsored yearly tournaments beginning in 1998. A Grand Chess tournament in Yerevan in 1996 attracted 21 chess masters.

Havannah, a connection game using hexagonal cells like Hex, offers "a subtler strategy and much more varied tactics" (Schmittberger 1992:116). The game was published by Ravensburger in 1981 and marketed for ten years, winning critical acclaim. In 2002, Freeling offered a €1,000 prize for any computer program in ten years that could beat him in even one game in a 10-game match, believing the nature of Havannah made the game difficult to program and therefore best played by human strategic thinking. In October 2012, via Internet, a 10-game match was conducted between Freeling and three Havannah bots. Freeling won by +7−3=0, losing two games to Lajkonik (Poland) and one game to Castro (Canada).

Hexdame exactly translates international draughts rules to a hexagonal gameboard, increasing options for moves and tactics, and reducing draws. (Note: Three kings defeat a solitary king in a Hexdame endgame, whereas four kings are required in international draughts.) The World Draughts Federation (FMJD) has actively promoted Hexdame as an alternative to the 10×10 game.

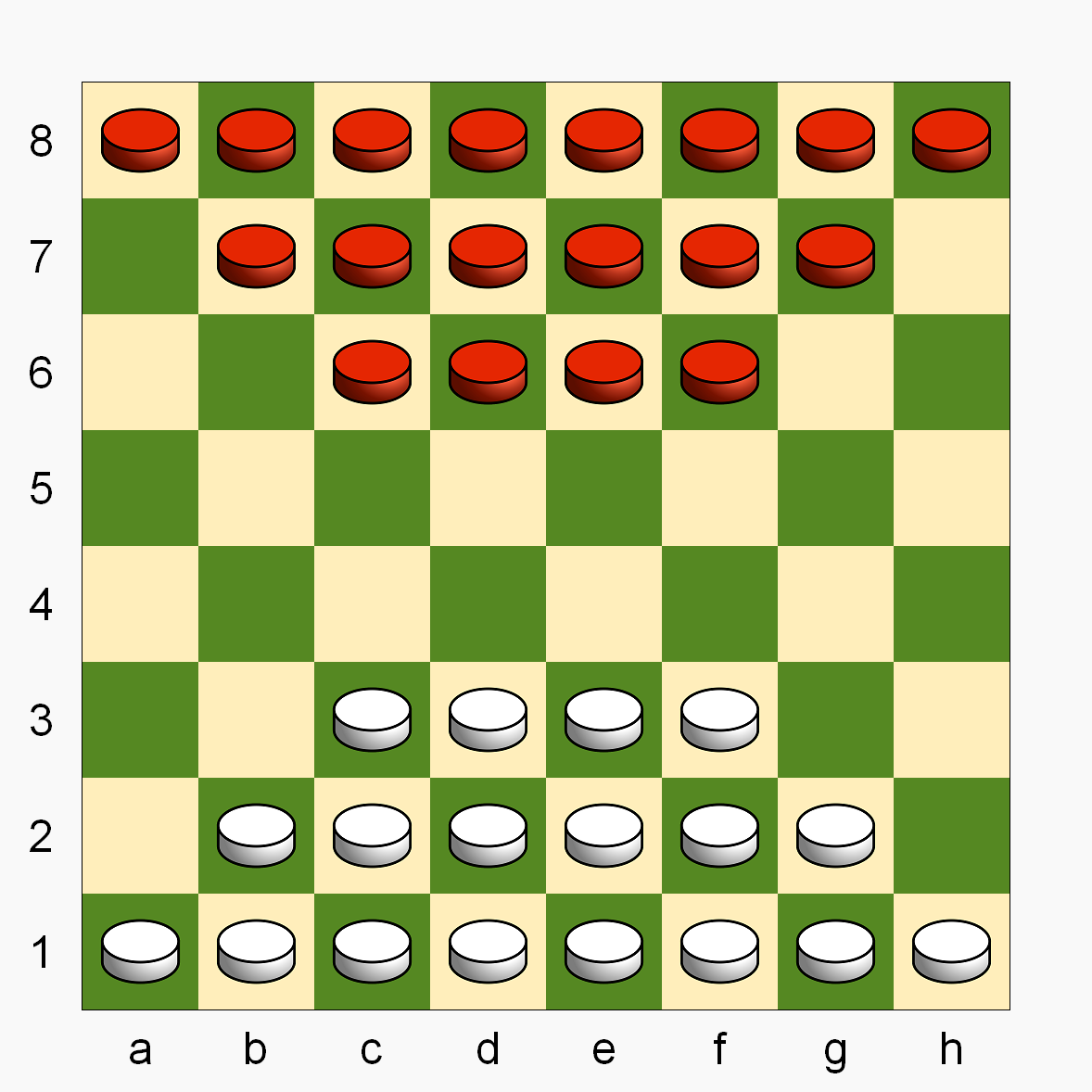
Dameo

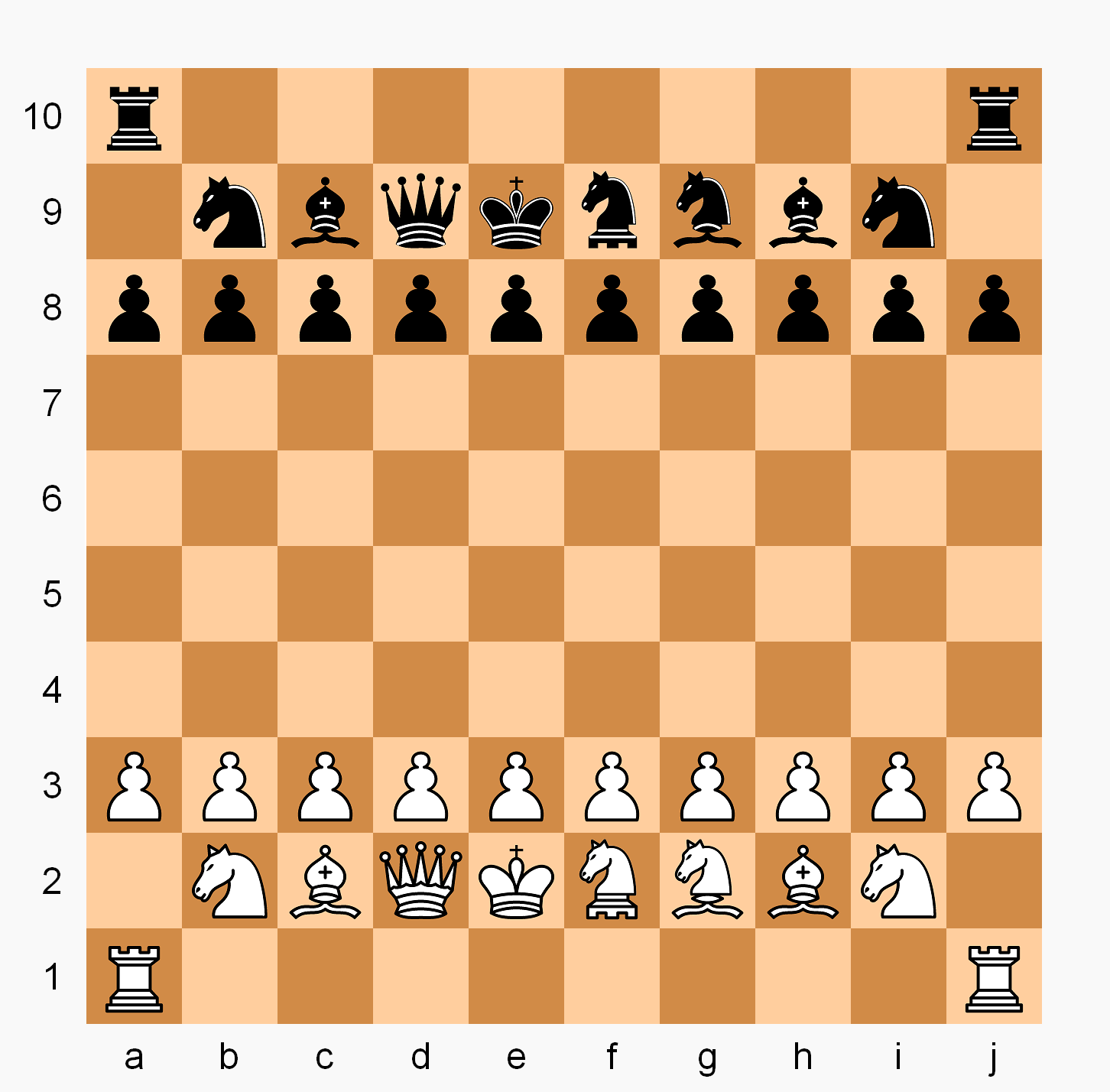
Grand Chess

Havannah winning structures

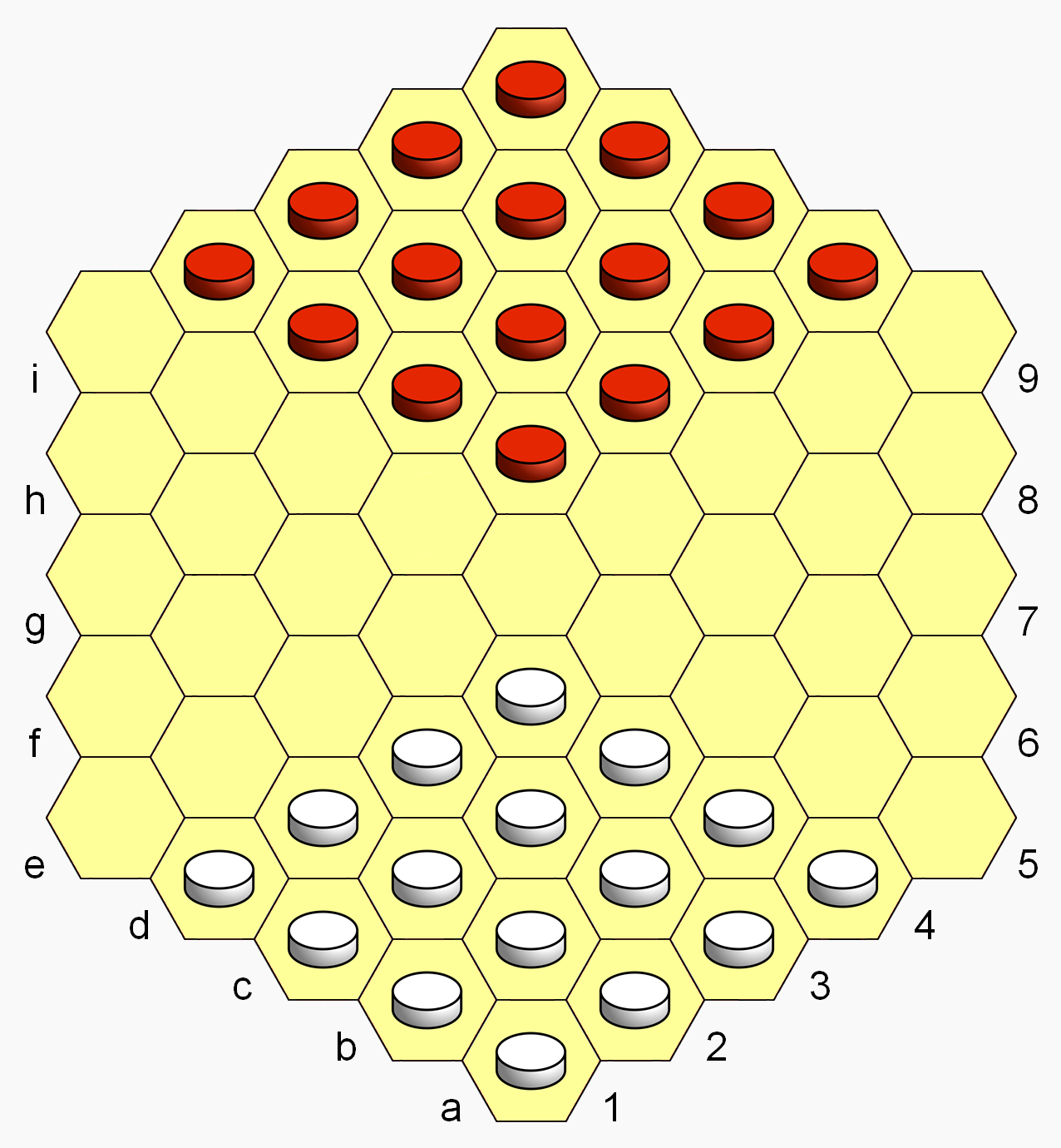
Hexdame

== Personal life and death ==
On 13 May 2000, SE Fireworks exploded 120 meters from Freeling's Enschede home, killing 23 people, wounding 947, and destroying 400 houses including Freeling's. Although uninjured, all his possessions and game materials were lost.

Freeling had three sons, born in 1975, 1978 and 1993, and one daughter, born in 1982. One of his sons invented Congo, a xiangqi variant, in 1982 when nearly eight years old.

Freeling died due to an accident at his home in Enschede, on 19 May 2026, at the age of 79.

== Games invented ==
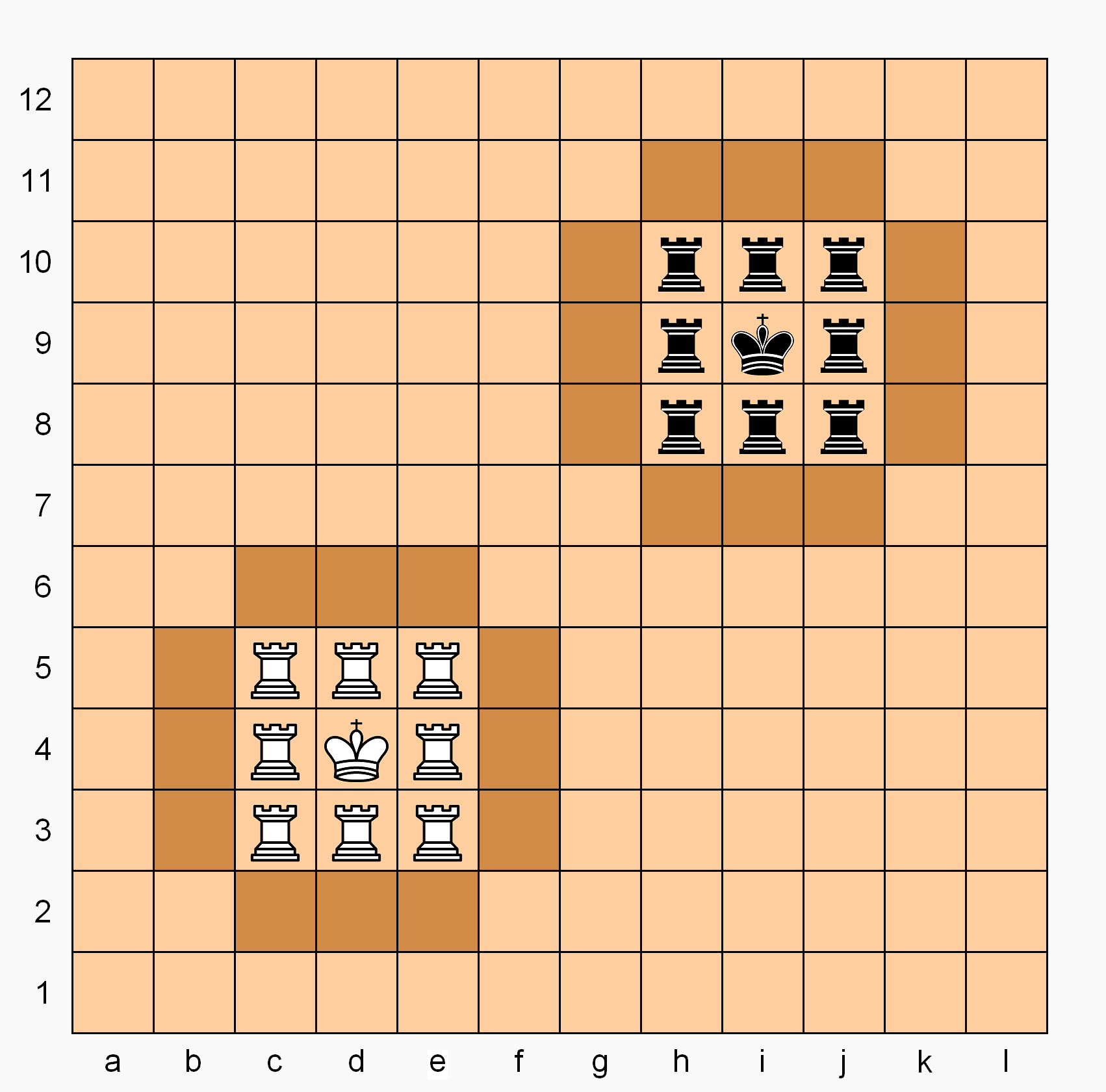
Chad

=== Chess variants ===
Most of the great games inventors (Abbott, Freeling, Knizia, Randolph, Sackson, Solomon, et al.) have produced Chess variants; [...]

— David Parlett, The Oxford History of Board Games (1999)

- Chad (1979)
- Chakra (1980)
- Yari shogi (1981)
- Rotary (1981)
- Shakti (1982)
- Caïssa (1982)
- Loonybird (1983)
- Dragonfly (1983)
- Grand Chess (1984)
- Cyclix (2011)
- King's Colour (2021)
- Royal Guard (2021, with Chris Huntoon)

=== Elimination games ===
- Bushka (1981)
- Hexdame (1979)
- Emergo (1980, with Ed van Zon)
- Crossfire (early 1980s)
- Dameo (2000)
- Pit of Pillars (2013)
- Loca (2020)

=== Territory games ===
- Sygo (2010)
- Mu (1982)
- Phalanx (1981)
- Medusa (1981)
- Lotus (1981)
- Macbeth (1981)
- Dominions (1984)
- Square Off (1982)
- Triccs (2012)
- Io (2014)
- Storisende (2018)
- Qascade (2020)
- XiaGo (2020)
- Migong (2020, with Luis Bolaños Mures)
- Cannons & Bullets (2021)
- Notubytu (2022)
- Renegado (2022)

=== Territory/connection hybrids ===
- Symple (2010, with Benedikt Rosenau)
- China Grove (2023)
- China Squares (2023)
- Sytran (2023)

=== Connection games ===
- Havannah (1979)
- Pylyx (2011)
- Scware (2012)
- Inertia (2013)
- Multiplicity (2013)
- Query (2010)
- Rondo (early 1980s)
- Starweb (2017)
- KnightVision (2021)
- Lox (2021)
- Uknight (2021)
- KnightShade (2021)
- Loops 'n Leaps (2021)
- Come Together (2025)

=== Mancala variants ===
- MiniMancala (late 1970s)
- The Glass Bead Game (late 1970s)
- Shakala (2022)
- Roocala (2025)

=== Race games ===
- Trackgammon (pre 1976)
- Breakthrough (1982)
- Jump Sturdy (2010)
- Goma (2025)

=== Others ===
- Hexade (1979)
- Mephisto (1979)
- Hanniball (2009, with Arty Sandler)
- Swish and Squeeze
- Monkey Trap (2010)
- Grabber (2011)
- King's Castle (2020)
- DropZone (2020)
- WedgeLock (2020)
- Crossbars (2021)
- Zumo (2022)
- China Tangle (2022)
- China Octangle (2023)
- Greylox (2024)
