= Mū tōrere =

Board game

- Mū tōrere gameboard and starting setup
- Genres: Board game; Abstract strategy game; Mind sport
- Skills: Strategy, tactics

Mū tōrere is a two-player board game played mainly by Māori people from New Zealand's North Island. Players have four counters each. The game has a simple premise but expert players are able to see up to 40 moves ahead. It is played on a gameboard (papa tākaro) and is tightly interwoven with stories and histories.

The Ngāti Hauā chief Wiremu Tamihana Te Waharoa reputedly offered a game to Governor George Grey with the whole country going to the winner, but Grey declined, possibly because Māori players of mū tōrere had been known to win large sums from pākehā visitors to New Zealand who were new to the game.

== Setup ==
Each player controls four counters (perepere), all eight placed pieces should form an octagon as endpoints or "tentacles" (kewai or kawai) encircling the center point (pūtahi) equidistant at an orientation of 45 degrees; this can be guided with an eight-pointed star drawn on the gameboard (papa tākaro) or inscribed into clay or sand. The pūtahi is kept empty at the beginning of the game (see illustration).

=== Rules ===
Players move one of their counters per turn to an empty point. Players can move only to an adjacent kewai, and can move to the pūtahi only when the moved counter is adjacent to an opponent's counter. The player who blocks all the opponent's counters from moving is the winner.

== Analysis ==
Mū tōrere has 1180 reachable positions. Out of those, 208 are winning, 128 are losing, and 844 are draws. The initial position is a draw.

== Bibliography ==
- Bell, R. C. (1979) [1st Pub. 1969, Oxford University Press, London]. Board and Table Games From Many Civilizations. Vol. II (Revised ed.). Dover Publications Inc. pp. 149–51. ISBN 0-671-06030-9.
- Bell, R. C. (1983). "Mu Torere". The Boardgame Book. Exeter Books. pp. 42–43. ISBN 0-671-06030-9.
- Murray, H. J. R. (1978). "§4.8.3 Mu-torere". A History of Board-Games other than Chess (Reissued ed.). Hacker Art Books Inc. p. 93. ISBN 0-87817-211-4.
- Parlett, David (1999). "Mu-torere". The Oxford History of Board Games. Oxford University Press Inc. pp. 160–61. ISBN 0-19-212998-8.
