= Chinese checkers =

Abstract strategy board game

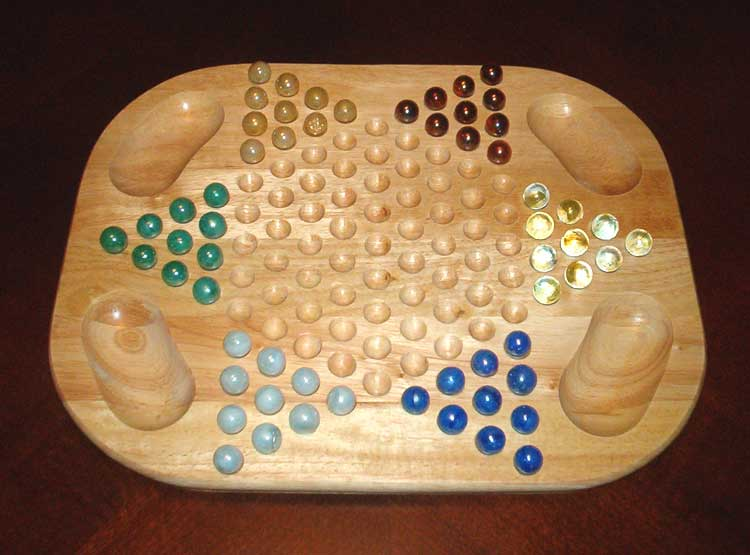
- A typical pitted-wood gameboard using six differently colored sets of marbles. Another popular format uses colored pegs in holes.
- Genres: Board game; Abstract strategy game
- Players: 2–4, 6
- Playing time: 10–30 minutes
- Chance: None
- Age range: 7+
- Skills: Strategy, tactics
- Synonyms: Star halma; Sternhalma; Hop Ching checkers; Tiaoqi ("jump chess")

Chinese checkers (US) or Chinese chequers (UK), known as Sternhalma in German, is a strategy board game of German origin that can be played by two, three, four, or six people, playing individually or with partners. The game is a modern and simplified variation of the game Halma.

The objective is to be first to race all of one's pieces across the hexagram-shaped board into "home"—the corner of the star opposite one's starting corner—using single-step moves or moves that jump over other pieces. The remaining players continue the game to establish second-, third-, fourth-, fifth-, and last-place finishers.

== History and nomenclature ==
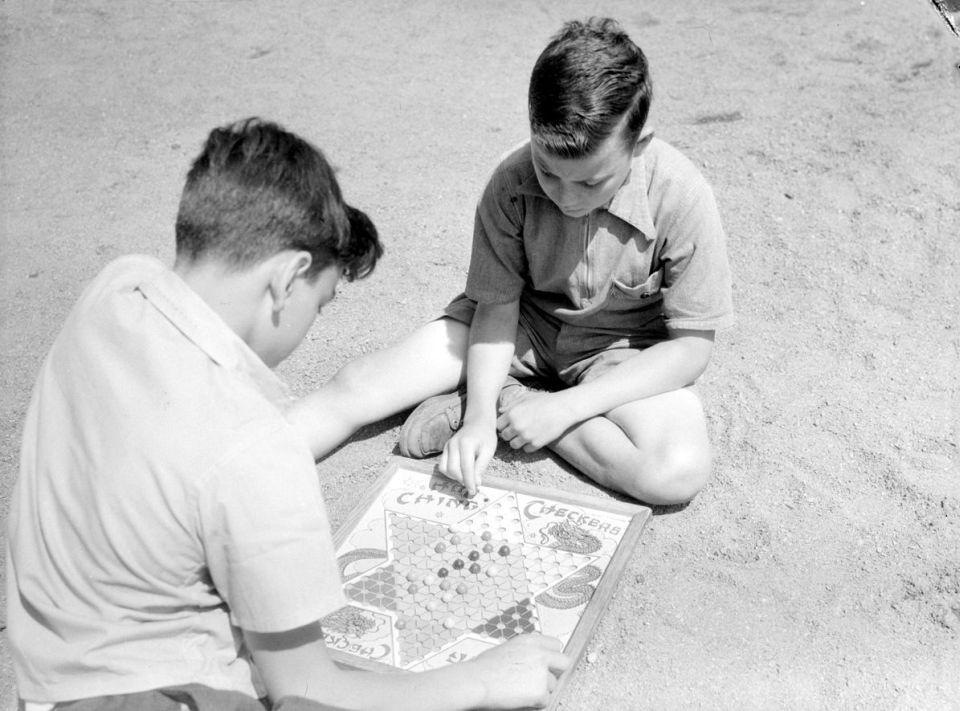
Playing Hop Ching checkers, Montreal, 1942

The game was invented in Germany in 1892 under the name "Stern-Halma" as a variation of the older American game Halma. Like all Halma games, there is a similarity to checkers. The Stern (German for 'star') refers to the board's star shape (in contrast to the square board used in Halma).

The name "Chinese checkers" originated in the United States as a marketing scheme by Bill and Jack Pressman in 1928. The Pressman company's game was originally called "Hop Ching checkers".

The game is known as tiaoqi (Chinese: 跳棋; pinyin: tiàoqí; lit. 'jump game') in Chinese. In Japan, the game has a variation called "diamond game" (ダイヤモンドゲーム, daiyamondo gēmu) with slightly different rules.

== Rules ==
A single move can consist of multiple hops; each piece hopped must be directly adjacent, and hops can be in any direction.

Each player has 10 pieces, which are usually pegs or marbles. (In games between two players, 15 pieces may be used. On bigger star boards, 15 or 21 pieces are used.) The aim is to race all one's pieces into the star corner on the opposite side of the board before the opponents do the same. The destination corner is called home.

In "hop across", the most popular variation, each player starts with their colored pieces on one of the six points or corners of the star and attempts to race them all home into the opposite corner. Players take turns moving a single piece, either by moving one step in any direction to an adjacent empty space, or by jumping in one or any number of available consecutive hops over other single pieces. A player may not combine hopping with a single-step move—a move consists of one or the other. There is no capturing in Chinese checkers, so pieces that are hopped over remain active and in play. Turns proceed clockwise around the board.

In the diagram, Blue might move the topmost piece one space diagonally forward as shown. A hop consists of jumping over a single adjacent piece, either one's own or an opponent's, to the empty space directly beyond it in the same line of direction. Red might advance the indicated piece by a chain of seven hops in a single move. It is not mandatory to make the most hops possible. (In some instances a player may choose to stop the jumping sequence part way in order to impede the opponent's progress, or to align pieces for planned future moves.)

=== Starting layouts ===
==== Six players ====
Can be played "all versus all", or three teams of two. When playing teams, teammates usually sit at opposite corners of the star, with each team member controlling their own colored set of pieces. The first team to advance both sets to their home destination corners is the winner. The remaining players usually continue play to determine second- and third-place finishers, etc.

==== Four players ====
The four-player game is the same as the game for six players, except that two opposite corners will be unused.

==== Three players ====
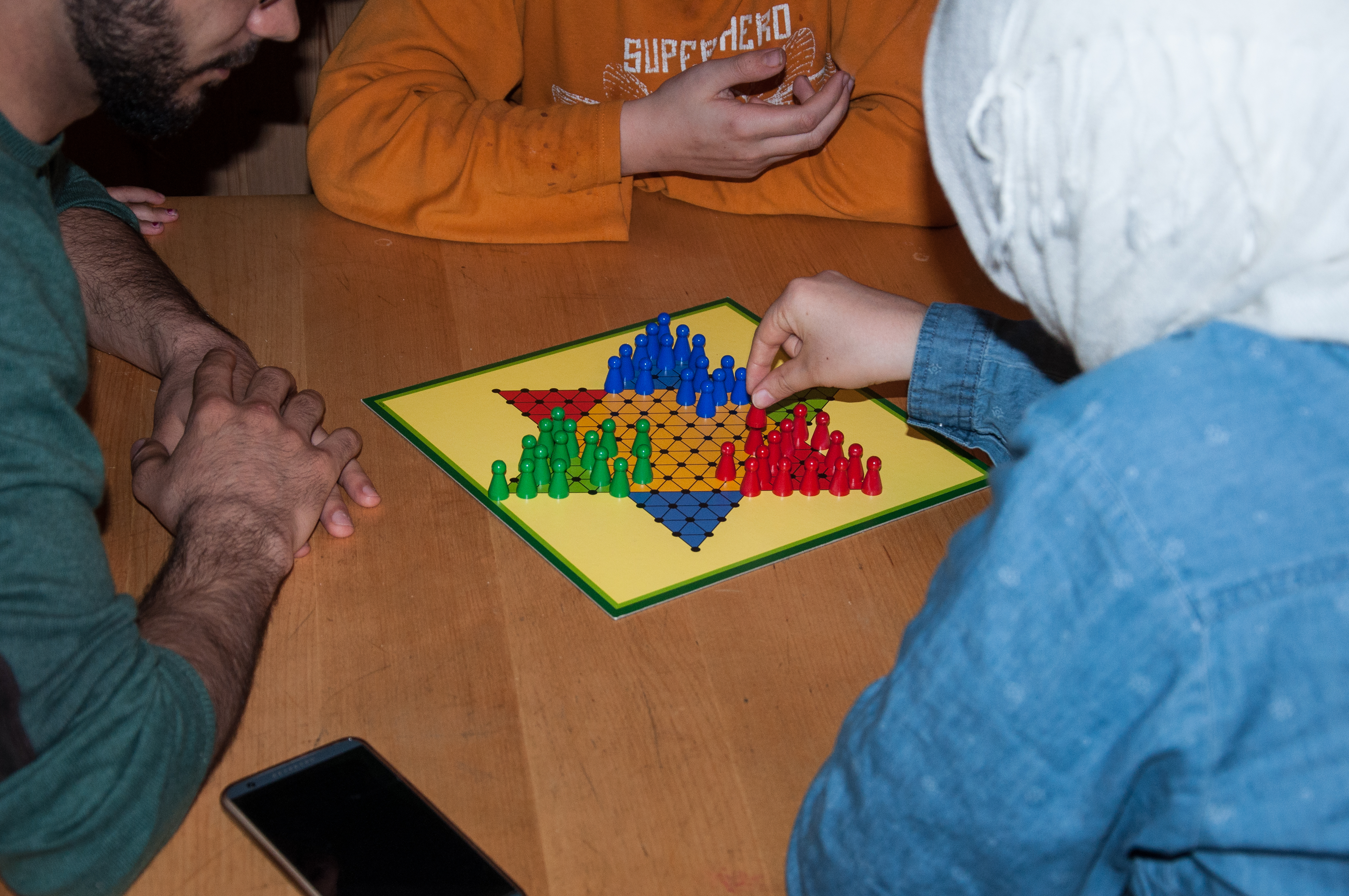
A three-player game

In a three-player game, all players control either one or two sets of pieces each. If one set is used, pieces race across the board into empty, opposite corners. If two sets are used, each player controls two differently colored sets of pieces at opposite corners of the star.

==== Two players ====
In a two-player game, each player plays one, two, or three sets of pieces. If one set is played, the pieces usually go into the opponent's starting corner, and the number of pieces per side is increased to 15 (instead of the usual 10). If two sets are played, the pieces can either go into the opponent's starting corners, or one of the players' two sets can go into an opposite empty corner. If three sets are played, the pieces usually go into the opponent's starting corners.

== Strategy ==
A basic strategy is to create or find the longest hopping path that leads closest to home, or immediately into it. (Multiple-jump moves are obviously faster to advance pieces than step-by-step moves.) Since either player can make use of any hopping 'ladder' or 'chain' created, a more advanced strategy involves hindering an opposing player, in addition to helping oneself make jumps across the board. Of equal importance are the players' strategies for emptying and filling their starting and home corners. Games between top players are rarely decided by more than a couple of moves. Differing numbers of players result in different starting layouts, in turn imposing different best-game strategies. For example, if a player's home destination corner starts empty (i.e. is not an opponent's starting corner), the player can freely build a 'ladder' or 'bridge' with their pieces between the two opposite ends. But if a player's opponent occupies the home corner, the player may need to wait for opponent pieces to clear before filling the home vacancies.

== Variants ==
=== Fast-paced or Super Chinese Checkers ===
While the standard rules allow hopping over only a single adjacent occupied position at a time (as in checkers), this version of the game allows pieces to catapult over multiple adjacent occupied positions in a line when hopping.

In the fast-paced or Super Chinese Checkers variant, popular in France, a piece may hop over a non-adjacent piece. A hop consists of jumping over a distant piece (friend or enemy) to a symmetrical position on the opposite side, in the same line of direction. (For example, if there are two empty positions between the jumping piece and the piece being jumped, the jumping piece lands, leaving exactly two empty positions immediately beyond the jumped piece.) As in the standard rules, a jumping move may consist of any number of a chain of hops. (When making a chain of hops, a piece is usually allowed to enter an empty corner, as long as it hops out again before the move is completed.)

Jumping over two or more pieces in a hop is not allowed. Therefore, in this variant, even more than in the standard version, it is sometimes strategically important to keep one's pieces bunched in order to prevent a long opposing hop.

An alternative variant allows hops over any symmetrical arrangement, including pairs of pieces, pieces separated by empty positions, and so on.

=== Capture ===
In the capture variant, all sixty game pieces start out in the hexagonal field in the center of the gameboard. The center position is left unoccupied, so pieces form a symmetric hexagonal pattern. Color is irrelevant in this variant, so players take turns hopping any game piece over any other eligible game piece(s) on the board. The hopped-over pieces are captured (retired from the game, as in English draughts) and collected in the capturing player's bin. Only jumping moves are allowed; the game ends when no further jumps are possible. The player with the most captured pieces is the winner.

The board is tightly packed at the start of the game. As more pieces are captured, the board frees up, often allowing multiple captures to take place in a single move.

Two or more players can compete in this variant, but if there are more than six players, not everyone will get a fair turn.

This variant resembles the game Leap Frog. The main difference being that in Leap Frog, the board is a square board.

=== Diamond game ===
Diamond gameboard with 73 playing spaces

Diamond game (Japanese: ダイヤモンドゲーム) is a variant of Chinese checkers played in South Korea and Japan. It uses the same jump rule as in Chinese checkers. The aim of the game is to enter all one's pieces into the star corner on the opposite side of the board, before opponents do the same. Each player has ten or fifteen pieces. Ten-piece diamond uses a smaller gameboard than Chinese checkers, with 73 spaces. Fifteen-piece diamond uses the same board as in Chinese checkers, with 121 spaces. To play diamond, each player selects one color and places their 10 or 15 pieces on a triangle. Two or three players can compete.

Usually, there are one "king piece" (王駒) and 14 common pieces (子駒) on each side. The king piece is the piece at the apex of each area and can jump over the common pieces, but the common pieces cannot jump over the king piece.

=== Yin and Yang ===
In Yin and Yang, only two players compete and as in chess, Go, and Othello, only the black and the white marbles are used. For more interesting play, at the start of the game, the triangle placement of the opponents' marbles does not have to be 180 degrees in opposition.

=== Order Out of Chaos ===
Two or more players select their coloured marbles and then those marbles are randomly placed in the centre of the board. The object of the game is then for the players to move their marbles out of the chaos to their home corners, creating order; the reverse of half a traditional game.
