= Chakra (chess variant) =

Chess variant invented by Christian Freeling

Position: a8 black knight, b8 black upside-down king, c8 black upside-down bishop, d8 black queen, e8 black king, f8 black upside-down rook, g8 black upside-down king, h8 black knight, a7 black champion, b7 black pawn, c7 black pawn, d7 black pawn, e7 black pawn, f7 black pawn, g7 black pawn, h7 black champion, a2 white champion, b2 white pawn, c2 white pawn, d2 white pawn, e2 white pawn, f2 white pawn, g2 white pawn, h2 white champion, a1 white knight, b1 white upside-down king, c1 white upside-down bishop, d1 white queen, e1 white king, f1 white upside-down rook, g1 white upside-down king, h1 white knight

Chakra starting position. in this diagram the Knight is the monkey, the king the emperor and queen the empress. the monk is represented by the inverted bishop, the samurai is the inverted rook and the courtesans is the inverted king

Chakra is a chess variant invented by Christian Freeling in 1980. The uniqueness of Chakra is owed to the invention of a new fairy piece named transmitter. (Note: "Chakra's reason for being is a very special 'piece', the transmitter". (Freeling)) Freeling considered an earlier version of the game as insignificant. (Note: "Chakra was one of the first, if not the first Chess variant I invented. The resulting game deviated too little from Chess to have any independent justification.") "Then one night in the early eighties, Ed [van Zon] and I dreamed up the 'transmitter', a piece consisting of two parts called 'chakras', that would function as a 'portal' for transmitting pieces."

The game was first featured in The Gamer magazine in 1981 (issue 3), resulting in much interest and the sale of many Chakra sets. Chakra is included in 100 Other Games to Play on a Chessboard (1983, 2002) by Stephen Addison.

== Overview ==
Chakra is played on a standard chessboard and has many of the standard play conventions as in chess, including check and the winning objective, checkmate. Stalemate, as in chess, is a draw. The king in Chakra is named emperor.

Each player starts with 16 pieces: 1 emperor, 1 empress, 1 samurai, 1 monk, 2 monkeys, 2 courtesans, 2 chakras, 6 swords. The emperor, empress, and monkey perform identically to their chess counterparts (king, queen, and knight, respectively). The others are governed by special fairy rules. There is no castling in Chakra.

== Move rules ==
- The samurai combines the powers of a chess king and a chess rook.
- The monk combines powers of a chess king and a chess bishop.
- A courtesan moves and captures like a chess king, but has an additional power: whenever it has an open path to its own emperor along a rank, file, or diagonal, it can move or capture along the rank, file, or diagonal in either direction.
- A sword moves like a chess pawn, except there is no en passant. It promotes upon reaching the back rank to any previously captured piece, except a chakra. (If no captured piece is available, a sword cannot promote; however, in that case it can still give check.)

=== The chakra and transmitter pieces ===
The most innovate feature of the game is the transmitter. This is one piece that has two halves, known as chakras. Together they make a teleportation portal.

Each Chakra has two sides; one is a knight, the other is a king. The Chakra will move like a knight or king, depending on which side is facing up. They start by moving like a knight. Chakras can only be moved during your turn if they are empty. This counts as your entire turn. You can then choose to flip the Chakra over to the other side. Alternatively, you can just flip the Chakra over during your turn. This also counts as your entire turn. You cannot move a Chakra onto another Chakra of any colour. Chakras cannot capture.

When a piece moves onto a blank friendly chakra, and there is a blank or enemy piece on the corresponding chakra, then it will be instantly moved to the corresponding chakra, and any enemy piece will be captured. If there is a friendly piece on the corresponding chakra, then the transmitter will not have any effect and the moving piece will occupy the first chakra.

Blocking occurs when a piece may be moved onto an opponent’s chakra. This means that a chakra can be used to block the attacking line. The players chakras do not hinder their own pieces. They are simply seen as empty spaces.

The transmitter can only be taken by the enemy King, as it can only move to an empty chakra. If one chakra is taken then the opposite chakra will instantly be removed from the board. However, if there is a piece on the chakra that is being removed it will still stay there.

A pawn may be promoted immediately using the transmitter. This is achieved by moving a friendly chakra to be in front of the pawn and have its partner to the back row. If there is an opponents piece in the partners chakra then it will be captured during the promotion.
