= Dameo =

Abstract strategy board game

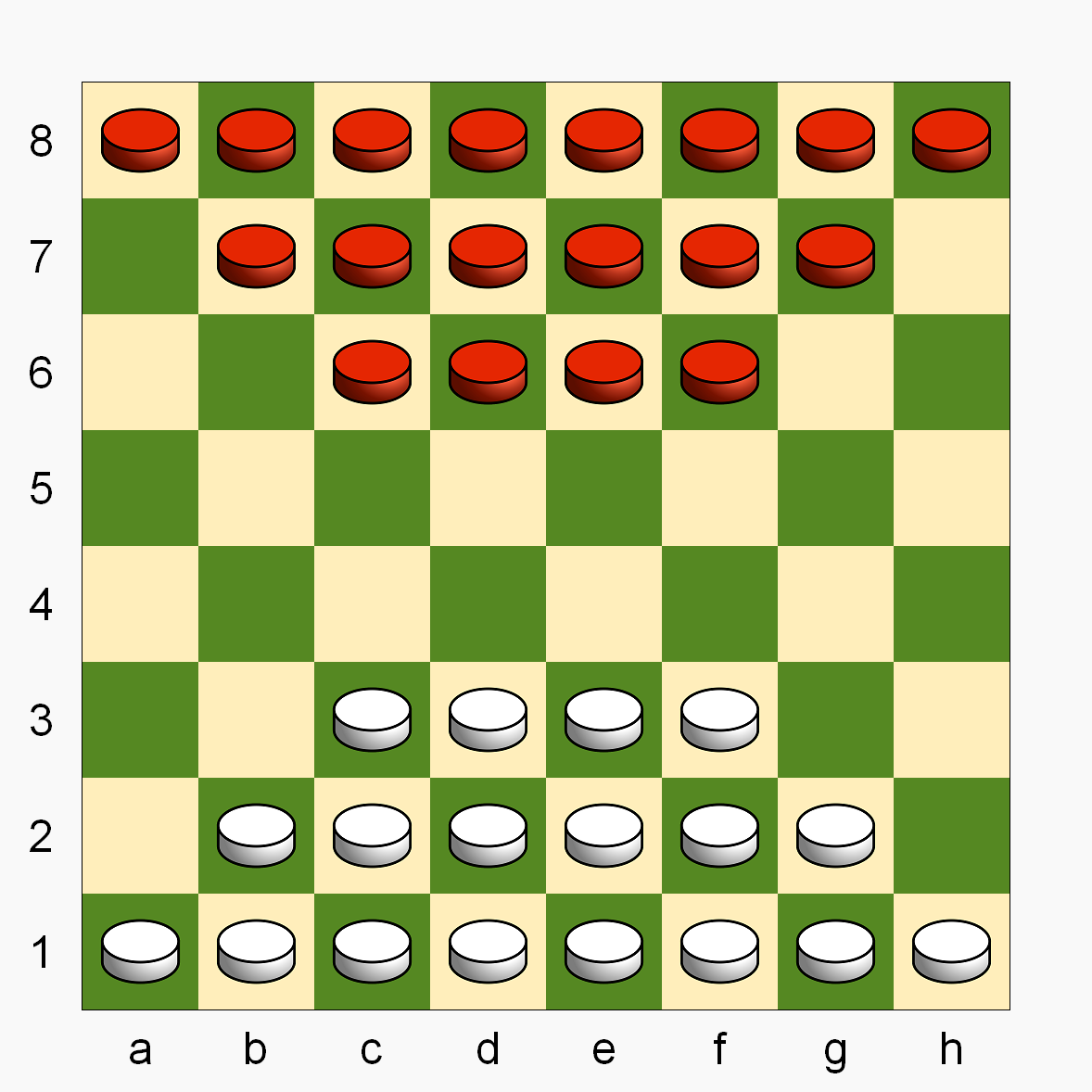
- Dameo starting position. White moves first. (Note: A common opening move for White is to move the line of two men at c2 and d1 to b3 and c2. This is executed by moving the man at the back of the line to the front: 1. d1b3. Less common opening moves are 1. d1d4 and 1. d1g4. Of course, it does not have to be the last man of a line: 1. d2d4 is also common.)
- Genres: Board game; Abstract strategy game
- Players: 2
- Setup time: Less than 1 minute
- Playing time: ~15 to 30 min.
- Chance: None
- Skills: Strategy, tactics

Dameo is an abstract strategy board game for two players created by Christian Freeling in 2000. It is a variant of the game checkers and is played on an 8×8 checkered gameboard.

== Setup ==
Dameo is played on an 8×8 checkerboard with 18 pieces per player. Each player's pieces are arranged so that the bottom three rows, from the perspective of the player, are filled from a1 to h1, b2 to g2, and c3 to f3, forming a distinctive trapezoid shape.

== Rules ==
	a	b	c	d	e	f	g	h
8	a8	b8	c8	d8	e8	f8	g8	h8	8
7	a7	b7	c7	d7	e7	f7	g7	h7	7
6	a6	b6	c6	d6	e6	f6	g6	h6	6
5	a5	b5	c5	d5	e5	f5	g5	h5	5
4	a4	b4	c4	d4	e4	f4	g4	h4	4
3	a3	b3	c3	d3	e3	f3	g3	h3	3
2	a2	b2	c2	d2	e2	f2	g2	h2	2
1	a1	b1	c1	d1	e1	f1	g1	h1	1
	a	b	c	d	e	f	g	h

The coup turc illustrates several of Dameo's rules. (Note: White wins with 1. c1e3 a5:c5 2. e1c3. Black is now obligated to capture the maximum number of men (four) with the multi-jump 2... c5:c1:h1:h3:d3 and must stop on d3, since the jumped men on c3 and d1 remain on the board until the multi-jump has been completed (the already-jumped man on c3 may not be jumped more than once, and the jumped man on d1 prevents Black from jumping the man on d2). The captured men are now removed, and White proceeds with the multi-jump 3. d2:d4:d6:b6:b8+.)
- The player with the lighter pieces moves first. Then turns alternate.
- The pieces, called men, can only move forward, either straight ahead or diagonally.
- In addition, men can jump over one or more adjacent men of the same color in a straight line, forward or diagonally, as long as the square at the front of the line is free.
- When a man reaches the last row on the opposite side of the board, it is crowned, or promoted, to a king. The king can move in all eight directions to any open cell within line of sight (i.e. not being blocked by a man or king), like a queen in chess.
- Capturing involves jumping over enemy pieces and removing them from the board. All captures in Dameo are orthogonal only. A man may capture an adjacent enemy piece, forwards, backwards, or sideways, by a jump to an empty square directly beyond the captured piece. If a jump is possible it must be done, even if doing so incurs a disadvantage.
- A king may capture an enemy piece by long jumping from any distance away to any empty square opposite the captured piece, so long as there is no other piece obstructing the path of the king.
- Multiple successive captures in a single turn must be made if, after each jump, there is an unoccupied square immediately beyond another enemy piece. The active player must play with the piece that can make the maximum number of captures.
- A jumped piece is removed from the board at the end of the turn. For a multi-jump move, captured pieces are not removed during the move; they are removed only after the entire multi-jump move is complete.
- The same piece may not be jumped more than once.
- A player with no valid move remaining loses. This occurs if the player has no pieces left, or if all the player's pieces are obstructed from moving by opponent pieces.
- A game is a draw if neither player can win the game.
- A game is considered a draw when the same position repeats three times by the same player (not necessarily consecutively).

== Strategy ==
Dameo differs in tactics and strategies from other draughts/checkers variants due to its double grid and linear movement of men. Familiar concepts such as majority capture, ladders and bridges, and the coup turc are present, along with unique tactics and strategies, such as the oblique hit and the king's trap.

=== Majority capture ===
	a	b	c	d	e	f	g	h
8	a8	b8	c8	d8	e8	f8	g8	h8	8
7	a7	b7	c7	d7	e7	f7	g7	h7	7
6	a6	b6	c6	d6	e6	f6	g6	h6	6
5	a5	b5	c5	d5	e5	f5	g5	h5	5
4	a4	b4	c4	d4	e4	f4	g4	h4	4
3	a3	b3	c3	d3	e3	f3	g3	h3	3
2	a2	b2	c2	d2	e2	f2	g2	h2	2
1	a1	b1	c1	d1	e1	f1	g1	h1	1
	a	b	c	d	e	f	g	h

Majority capture: If Black moves his king on b1 to f1 trying to capture White's men on f2 and f5, White can respond by moving his man on a3 to a4. Due to the maximum capture rule, Black must move f1 to f6 instead of capturing White's man on a4. This allows White to respond by capturing all of Black's men on a5, b6, c7, d8, e7, and Black's king on f6.

Majority capture is a fundamental part of Dameo. The substance of it is the sacrifice of two or more men in order to manipulate the opponent's position to set up a devastating counterattack. This usually takes the form of board spanning multiple captures for material advantage, but can be for the sake of a positional advantage ending in the promotion to a king as well. Majority capture often plays a role in more specific or localized tactics such as the ladder strike, coup turc, or oblique hit.

=== Ladder and Bridge ===
	a	b	c	d	e	f	g	h
8	a8	b8	c8	d8	e8	f8	g8	h8	8
7	a7	b7	c7	d7	e7	f7	g7	h7	7
6	a6	b6	c6	d6	e6	f6	g6	h6	6
5	a5	b5	c5	d5	e5	f5	g5	h5	5
4	a4	b4	c4	d4	e4	f4	g4	h4	4
3	a3	b3	c3	d3	e3	f3	g3	h3	3
2	a2	b2	c2	d2	e2	f2	g2	h2	2
1	a1	b1	c1	d1	e1	f1	g1	h1	1
	a	b	c	d	e	f	g	h

Ladder: If Black moves his man on f6 to f5 trying to gain material advantage, White can respond by moving his man on e5 to c7 with linear movement. This forces Black to move his man on b7 and capture White's men on c7 and d6 landing on d5 because of the maximum capture rule. White can then counterattack with his man on g5, capturing Black's men on f5, d5, c4, and b3 winning the game.

In a ladder strike, the capture resembles moving up or down stairs, as the men are positioned (or forced into a position) where a row of men are lined up diagonally. Clever positioning of your own piece can allow for a majority capture wherein the piece simply "goes up or down the stairs" by alternating capture up (or down) with right or left movement. Setting up this type of majority capture often involves an opponent's piece carelessly placed between two of your own pieces.

A bridge is a simple setup for the ladder strike, where pieces are sacrificed one by one, to position an opponent's man into an ideal position for a ladder strike. They "bridge" the starting position into a winning ladder strike position.

=== Coup turc ===
	a	b	c	d	e	f	g	h
8	a8	b8	c8	d8	e8	f8	g8	h8	8
7	a7	b7	c7	d7	e7	f7	g7	h7	7
6	a6	b6	c6	d6	e6	f6	g6	h6	6
5	a5	b5	c5	d5	e5	f5	g5	h5	5
4	a4	b4	c4	d4	e4	f4	g4	h4	4
3	a3	b3	c3	d3	e3	f3	g3	h3	3
2	a2	b2	c2	d2	e2	f2	g2	h2	2
1	a1	b1	c1	d1	e1	f1	g1	h1	1
	a	b	c	d	e	f	g	h

Coup turc: White moves to win by playing his man on f2 to d4 by linear movement. Because of the maximum capture rule, Black is forced to respond by playing his king on d8 and capturing White's men on d4, e2, g3, and f4 landing on e4 (because of the rule whereby pieces are not removed from the board until the end of the turn, combined with the rule that forbids jumping over the same piece twice). This leaves White's man on e3 free to counterattack by capturing Black's king on e4 along with his men on e6 and f7.

In Dameo, captured men are removed at the end of the turn and not during the turn itself. This, combined with the rule that disallows jumping over the same piece twice, makes the coup turc (Note: Sometimes known as the Turkish hit.) possible. In essence, the tactic is the same as a majority capture, the goal being the manipulation of an opponent's man or king to an advantageous position for a multi-piece capture. The coup turc manages it by forcing an opponent's piece to capture in a sequence ending on a square next to a piece it already captured, lining up perfectly for the player's piece to then counterattack with a majority capture.

=== Oblique hit ===
	a	b	c	d	e	f	g	h
8	a8	b8	c8	d8	e8	f8	g8	h8	8
7	a7	b7	c7	d7	e7	f7	g7	h7	7
6	a6	b6	c6	d6	e6	f6	g6	h6	6
5	a5	b5	c5	d5	e5	f5	g5	h5	5
4	a4	b4	c4	d4	e4	f4	g4	h4	4
3	a3	b3	c3	d3	e3	f3	g3	h3	3
2	a2	b2	c2	d2	e2	f2	g2	h2	2
1	a1	b1	c1	d1	e1	f1	g1	h1	1
	a	b	c	d	e	f	g	h

Oblique hit: The opposing squares make the combination of linear movement with majority capture possible. It is generally most useful for the player closest to the king's row.

The oblique hit combines the rules regarding linear movement and maximum capture. In the diagram, White wins by moving c3 to e5 (bottom left white man to the square just to the right of bottom right black man). Black has two captures available, d5 to f5, capturing the man White just moved, and c5 to e3, capturing the man on c4 and then immediately after the one on d3. Maximum capture takes precedence, however, so Black must capture the two men on c4 and d3. This leaves White open to capture the black men on d5 and c6 landing one square away from the king's row (c7). If Black moves his man closest to the king's row he will not be able to reach it before White or stop White's other man from reaching the other king's row first.

=== King's trap ===
	a	b	c	d	e	f	g	h
8	a8	b8	c8	d8	e8	f8	g8	h8	8
7	a7	b7	c7	d7	e7	f7	g7	h7	7
6	a6	b6	c6	d6	e6	f6	g6	h6	6
5	a5	b5	c5	d5	e5	f5	g5	h5	5
4	a4	b4	c4	d4	e4	f4	g4	h4	4
3	a3	b3	c3	d3	e3	f3	g3	h3	3
2	a2	b2	c2	d2	e2	f2	g2	h2	2
1	a1	b1	c1	d1	e1	f1	g1	h1	1
	a	b	c	d	e	f	g	h

King's trap: If Black's man on b2 tries to enter the king's row on b1, White can leave his men there forcing Black to capture c1 and f1 landing on g1. This allows White to capture Black's king with his man on h1. If Black's man on d2 tries to enter the king's row on d1 or e1, he leaves himself immediately open to capture on White's turn.

The king's trap is a defense that takes advantage of Dameo's linear movement. (Note: If a square in the second row is empty for the man being moved forward, then linear movement is unnecessary.) Because of forced capture, if a man lands on the king's row and is crowned, the opponent can, if they have at least four men in a line on the king's row, move the man second closest to the king forward. This forces the king to jump the piece closest to him and land in the empty space directly next to the remaining two men on the king's row, allowing for a counter capture on the next turn. The move is also possible when there is a line of three men ending on one of the corners.

Another king's trap made possible by Dameo is the a1, c1, f1, and h1 configuration (see diagram). If a man lands on b1 or g1, then on his next turn, because of maximum capture and the king's long range, he is forced to capture men until he lands on g1 (if he started on b1) or b1 (if he started on g1). This allows the opponent to engage in a counter capture of the king on their turn because of their man in the corner. If the opponent's man lands on either d1 or e1, it leaves him open for immediate capture by the opponent's man on c1 or f1, respectively.

== History ==
Dameo has its origins in Christian Freeling's 1988 game Bushka, itself inspired by the traditional Madagascar game Fanorona. Freeling felt the game to be very volatile on the whole. Fanorona's capture methods of approach and withdrawal, however, struck him as being unique among Alquerque derived games, which generally feature capture by jumping over pieces. While capture by withdrawal seemed uninviting, capture by approach left an impression on him and he began thinking of ways to incorporate it into a draughts framework. At first the translation was straightforward, and Bushka was essentially International draughts with a 9×11 board size and capture by approach or "contact". Freeling found this to be functional, but uninspiring due to the need for connected vacant squares to achieve more complicated multicapture moves.

He returned to Fanorona which allows a single man to capture whole lines of men by its capture method rather than just a single man. This allows a player to "...carve deeper into an opponent's position..." and achieve similar capturing power to multicapture moves in draughts, but it didn't sit right with Freeling due to the oddity of "...one man axing a whole phalanx." He let the idea sit for awhile before coming up with the concept of linear movement and capture, where whole lines of two or more men move and capture together as a phalanx. He says that, in retrospect, it was an obvious choice to " ...let the capture of a line of men be by a line of men." This development largely led to the completion of Bushka as it stands today lacking only the later reversion to the 10×10 board and a starting count of 15 men.

Like capture by approach, the linear movement mechanic inspired Freeling to look at incorporating it into other games. His first attempt was similar to his attempt with capture by approach, he simply added the concept to International draughts. His reasoning was that it would speed up the game, allowing for quicker entry into the mid and late game. The way it worked out, however, was largely to create gridlock and slow down the game considerably as it added "defensive" capabilities to both sides without adding any compensating offense. Freeling eventually abandoned the concept in draughts until 15 years later when he encountered Croda.

Croda was invented in 1995 by Ljuban Dedić. A variant of Turkish draughts, Croda was the result of a search for a checkers variant with the smallest percentage of draws. In it Dedić replaced the sideways movement of the man in Turkish draughts with a diagonally forwards movement, and filled the back rank with men for a total of 24 compared to Turkish draughts' 16. He also replaced Turkish draught's rule of removal of captured pieces during a turn with removal of captured pieces at the end of the turn.

Croda inspired Freeling to apply his concept of linear movement to a draughts game.

Dameo has been featured in an article by Freeling in Abstract Games... for the competitive thinker, has online tournaments on Littlegolem, Brainking, and igGamecenter. Belarusian checkers player Aleh Tapalnitski wrote a book on its strategy.

== See also ==
- Armenian draughts
- Hexdame
