= Master of the Five Magics =

1980 fantasy novel by Lyndon Hardy

- Cover of first edition
- Author: Lyndon Hardy
- Cover artist: Rowena Morrill
- Language: English
- Series: Magics
- Genre: Fantasy novel
- Publisher: Del Rey
- Publication date: October 1980
- Publication place: United States
- Media type: Print (Paperback)
- Pages: 373 pp
- ISBN: 0-345-31907-9
- OCLC: 14198021
- Followed by: Secret of the Sixth Magic

Master of the Five Magics is a fantasy novel by Lyndon Hardy, first published in 1980. It is the first of a trilogy set in the same world; the second book is Secret of the Sixth Magic and the third Riddle of the Seven Realms. The books feature different characters, but each explores the same system of magic in successively more detail. It may be an early example of hard fantasy.

== Plot summary ==
The book focuses on the adventures of its main character and hero Alodar in the fictional land of Procolon. Alodar's self-imposed quest for much of the book is to distinguish himself sufficiently to wed Queen Vendora, which will restore his family's honor.

The book is divided into six parts, the first five of which correspond to the five disciplines of magic learned by Alodar in that portion of the narrative. The final part is entitled "The Archimage" and corresponds to Alodar's mastery of all other forms of magic.

In the first three parts, Alodar learns enough of a particular type of magic to make a notable achievement, but the antagonist of that part usurps Alodar's credit and becomes a recognized suitor to the queen. Alodar is then left with an artifact of some type that allows him to begin learning a new discipline of magic. The first part also introduces Aeriel, a female character important in the second half of the book.

The fourth part does not feature an artifact; instead, Alodar discovers an ancient wizard placed in suspended animation, who reveals the basics of his craft to Alodar at the start of the fifth part.

The fifth part of the book reveals that Alodar's journey was planned by the ancient wizards, who predicted the now-imminent demonic invasion.

In the sixth and final part, Alodar uses his knowledge of all five magical disciplines in combination to defeat the leader of the demon army. However, Alodar spurns both marriage to the queen and an offer by his previous antagonists to support a coup placing Alodar on the throne; instead, he chooses to marry Aeriel and continue his apprenticeship, hoping to one day claim the title of Archmage.

== Characters ==
- Alodar, protagonist of the book. His family is stated to have once been noble; however, they have fallen into disrepute by the start of the narrative. Therefore, Alodar is merely an apprentice to a thaumaturge, the least prestigious type of magic-user.
- Vendora, the queen of Procolon.
- Aeriel, advisor to Vendora. She confesses her love to Alodar in the first part of the book, but Alodar does not clearly reciprocate until the final chapter.
- Feston, antagonist in the first part of the book. His father Festil is a nobleman in Vendora's service. They take full credit for the queen's escape from a besieged fortress, ignoring Alodar's important contributions, leading the queen to name Feston as an official candidate suitor.
- Basil, antagonist in the second part of the book. One of his henchmen steals an alchemical potion from Alodar and uses it to gather a vast wealth of gems for Basil. This gives Basil sufficient leverage to court the queen.
- Duncan, a magician appearing in the third part of the book. He completes a ritual on an artifact discovered by Alodar, making it into a powerful talisman. This causes the queen to name him yet another official marriage candidate.
- Kelric, an elderly sorcerer who instructs Alodar in the fourth part of the book.
- Handar, a wizard placed in suspended animation. In the fifth part of the book, he instructs Alodar in the basics of wizardry.

== Disciplines of Magic ==
A primary focus of the plot is upon the five magics of the title: Thaumaturgy, Alchemy, Magic, Sorcery, and Wizardry. In the system devised for the trilogy, each discipline allows the user to perform magical actions within a particular set of rules. These rules are specified after the table of contents and are also stated within the narrative. Listed below are the basics of each discipline:

=== Thaumaturgy ===
Thaumaturgy is governed by the Principles of Sympathy and Contagion. Through the Principle of Sympathy, a thaumaturge can manipulate matter and energy on a grand scale by simulating the intended effect on a smaller scale. For example, lifting up a large boulder by picking up a smaller, yet similar stone. Thaumaturgy is limited by the energy required to perform the work. Drawing too much on their body’s energy can kill the thaumaturge, so they draw it out of their environment (like from a fire or a spinning wheel). No sympathetic connection is perfect, so some energy is always lost. Through the Principle of Contagion, they can reduce the amount of energy lost by using an actual piece of the target.

Thaumaturgy is performed by reciting incantations, which bind the energy to the simulation. Thaumaturges often protect these incantations by speaking nonsense syllables around the words of power to disguise them.

Thaumaturges wear brown capes, and are treated as common craftsmen, using their art to fix leaks in roofs and increase the yield of crops. To become a thaumaturge, one has to apprentice themselves to a master. After proving a certain level of mastery, they become a journeyman. And once they prove themselves, they can become a master thaumaturge.

Cunning is the most important attribute a thaumaturge can have.

=== Alchemy ===
Alchemy is governed by the Doctrine of Signatures. This doctrine states that every alchemical ingredient has physical attributes, which indicate the possible powers it may yield when blended in a potion. Alchemy is limited because potions have to be produced in bulk, as random factors will cause a potion to fail, with the chance of failure increasing with each step. Alchemical products only retain their potency for weeks, or even days at a time. After that, they become useless.

Apart from the blending of ingredients, the potion must be activated by writing the potion’s formula using arcane symbols, which alchemists jealously guard.

Alchemists wear white robes. They are merchants, who trade ingredients and recipes among themselves, as well as sell their potions. Sometimes, alchemists form factories, producing weaker potions in massive quantities. In order to become an alchemist, novices have to study under a master.

Perseverance is the most important attribute an alchemist can have.

=== Magic ===
Magic is governed by the Maxim of Persistence. In order to create a magical object, rituals have to be performed perfectly. Any mistake will ruin the ritual, and won’t produce a magical object. Once made, it lasts forever.

The making of a magical object is a matter of creating a ritual and then performing it. Each ritual exercise—the drawing of a bow, the ringing of a bell, etc—has a numerical value. By arranging these numerals in a mathematically perfect sequence, a magical object is produced. New objects are made by deducing new sequences based on rituals performed previously.

The more powerful the end product, the more complex the rituals, and the longer it takes before they can be performed.

Magicians usually cluster into large Orders, since magic requires great dedication and study. Rituals can involve many different participants, including choruses to sing incantations and dancers to move in precise sequences. They wear blue robes, with lighter shades for lower-ranking members and darker robes for higher-ranking members. Neophytes perform simple tasks and aid in rituals, but are not allowed to study magic. Initiates study the most basic kinds of magic. Once they've proven their knowledge, they become Acolytes. It takes a lot more study to become a Master.

Logic is the most important attribute a magician can have.

=== Sorcery ===
Sorcery is the control of one mind by another. To establish control, a sorcerer has to make eye contact with the victim and then recite the proper charm. According to the Rule of Three, which governs sorcery, each charm has to be recited three times. The stronger the charm, the harder it is to complete the recital. Once committed, a charm cannot be abandoned or misspoken, as that will result in headaches, hallucinations, nausea, and even death, depending on how powerful the charm is. Sorcery is limited by the cost of each charm. With each charm, a sorcerer spends a portion of their life-force. Once it is all used up, they perish. The greater the charm, the more of their vital essence is spent.

Sorcerers wear grey robes and are often employed in the courts of kings, queens, and lords. Every ruler can find a use for a sorcerer: as a seer or soothsayer to provide guidance, as an entertainer weaving complex illusions, or as a powerful asset in battle, controlling the minds of their enemies. A student of sorcery is known as a "tyro."

Bravery is the most important attribute a sorcerer can have.

=== Wizardry ===
Wizardry is governed by the Laws of Ubiquity and Dichotomy. Through the Law of Ubiquity, fire is used to open a passage to the realm of demons. For stronger demons, specific and sometimes rare substances have to be burned. According to the Law of Dichotomy, once summoned, there must be one master and one slave, nothing in between. This is decided by a contest of wills—either the wizard is stronger, and becomes the master, or the demon is stronger, and his warlock slave must do his bidding.

Summoned demons weaken the barrier between this world and the demon’s world, meaning that when a demon is pulled through, another one can be pulled through much more easily. Once the demon has returned, the barrier is restored.

Wizards wear black robes. During the events of the novel, wizardry is basically a dead art. The only remaining wizards are circus performers. Before their fall, however, they were widely respected; even kings deferred to the word of a wizard.

Strength of will is the most important attribute a wizard can have.

=== Metamagic ===
Introduced in the sequel, Metamagic is the art of manipulating the seven laws that govern the other five magics. It involves suspending the current rules, replacing them with new rules, and then reinstating the rules. The greater skill the Metamagician has, the greater the difference between the old rule and the new rule can be.

== In popular culture ==
The song "Five Magics" on Megadeth's 1990 hit album Rust in Peace was inspired by this book, although the five magics listed in the song's lyrics differ from those in the book. The five magics in the song are listed as Alchemy, Sorcery, Wizardry, Thermatology, and Electricity.

Author Patrick Rothfuss spoke during an author's panel at the Phoenix Comicon in 2014 and credited Master of the Five Magics as influential in the writing of his Kingkiller Chronicle (The Name of the Wind (2007), The Wise Man's Fear (2011), The Slow Regard of Silent Things (2014), and the unpublished Doors of Stone).

Richard Garfield revealed in an interview that the five-color model of Magic: The Gathering was inspired by Master of The Five Magics.
