= Gemma Rovira Ortega =

English-Spanish translator

Gemma Rovira Ortega (born 1974) is an English-Spanish translator from Barcelona, known for translating the Harry Potter series, The Boy in the Striped Pyjamas and The Kingkiller Chronicle series into Spanish.

== Biography ==
She studied Spanish Philology at the Universidad Central de Barcelona when a faculty for Translation Studies did not exist yet. At that time she still did not know what she wanted to do for a living. She also studied English at the British Institute of Barcelona where she obtained the Certificate of Proficiency in English from Cambridge Assessment English.

== Career ==
Since 1988 she has dedicated herself exclusively to English-Spanish translation. She has worked with various publishing houses: Anagrama, Minotauro, Random House or Salamandra. Rovira began translating the Harry Potter series in 2004, her first translation being that of Harry Potter and the Order of the Phoenix. She has also translated books by Anne Tyler and The Boy in the Stripped Pyjamas by John Boyne, a best seller book in Spain in 2007 and 2008.

She is also a member of APTIC (Professional Association of Translators and Interpreters of Catalonia) and of ACE Translators (Autonomous Section of Translators of the Spanish Association of Writers) between 2006 and 2010.

== Translated books ==
- Harry Potter series by J.K. Rowling
  - Harry Potter and the Order of the Phoenix
  - Harry Potter and the Half-Blood Prince
  - Harry Potter and the Deathly Hallows
  - Fantastic Beasts and Where to Find Them
  - Quidditch Through the Ages
  - The Tales of Beedle the Bard
- The Kingkiller Chronicle by Patrick Rothfuss
  - The Name of the Wind
  - The Wise Man's Fear
  - "The Slow Regard of Silent Things"
- Other books (partial list):
  - The Piano Tuner by Daniel Mason
  - Snow Flower and the Secret Fan by Lisa See
  - The Penelopiad by Margaret Atwood
  - A Short History of Myth by Karen Armstrong
  - Oxygen by Andrew Miller
  - The Amateur Marriage by Anne Tyler
  - The Secret History by Donna Tartt
