= Tunnel Bob =

Tunnel explorer in Wisconsin, US

Robert Gruenenwald, better known as Tunnel Bob, is a resident of Madison, Wisconsin, who is known for exploring the steam tunnels under the University of Wisconsin–Madison. He had said prior to 2008 that he has been exploring the tunnels since the 1970s and has asked for permission to volunteer to help maintain the tunnels but has been denied. Bob denies sleeping in the tunnels due to danger, stating that "you might wake up dead". He has been cited and fined multiple times for "unauthorized presence". He is currently banned from several UW-Madison properties.

Tunnel Bob was the inspiration for The Kingkiller Chronicle character Auri. Author Patrick Rothfuss was a resident of Madison, and his father told him stories of Tunnel Bob. According to Rothfuss, Rothfuss' father gave Tunnel Bob permission to work in the tunnels for three hours a week, which was used as part of the persona of Auri: "Well, the first hour I walks around a bit, and the second hour I cleans up some, and the third hour, well, that's just for me."
