= Technomancer =

Technomancer may refer to:

- A magician who combines magic and technology or a diviner who divines using technology; see Methods of divination § T

== Games ==
- GURPS Technomancer, a GURPS campaign setting
- The Technomancer, a 2016 video game

== Other uses ==
- Technomancer (album), a 2015 album by Pictureplane

== See also ==
- Technofantasy
- Technomage (disambiguation)
- Technology in science fiction
