= Seth Dickinson =

American fantasy and science fiction writer

- Education: University of Chicago
- Writing career
- Genre: Hard fantasy
- Notable work: The Traitor Baru Cormorant (2015)
- Website: sethdickinson.com

Seth Dickinson is an American writer of fantasy and science fiction, best known for the 2015 debut novel The Traitor Baru Cormorant and its sequels The Monster Baru Cormorant and The Tyrant Baru Cormorant.

== Career ==
Dickinson graduated from the University of Chicago. While there, in 2011, Dickinson received the Dell Magazines Award for Undergraduate Excellence in Science Fiction and Fantasy Writing for the short story "The Immaculate Conception of Private Ritter". Dickinson has published short fiction in Clarkesworld, Strange Horizons, Lightspeed, and Beneath Ceaseless Skies, among others.

Dickinson also writes and does narrative design for video games, including for Destiny: The Taken King and Subnautica 2. Dickinson has also written for Magic: The Gathering.

Dickinson's debut novel was The Traitor Baru Cormorant, a hard fantasy expansion of the 2011 short story "The Traitor Baru Cormorant, Her Field-General, and Their Wounds" (published in Beneath Ceaseless Skies). It follows a young woman who, educated in the schools of the imperial power that colonized her homeland, sets out to gain power to subvert the empire from within. It was published in September 2015 and was well received by critics. It was published as The Traitor in the UK. The Traitor Baru Cormorant is the first novel in Dickinson's The Masquerade series. The original draft for a sequel was split into two books: The Monster Baru Cormorant, and The Tyrant Baru Cormorant, published in 2020. While the series was originally planned to be a trilogy, a fourth novel has been announced.

Dickinson's fourth novel Exordia is a science fiction story which was released in January 2024. Publishers Weekly wrote: "With cool alien technology, admirably hopeful heroes, and SFF pop culture references littered throughout, this will have readers hooked." Dickinson has said that the book was inspired by the LEGO Bionicle toy line, as well as novels The Andromeda Strain and Sphere by Michael Crichton.

== Bibliography ==
=== Novels ===
==== The Masquerade series ====
1. The Traitor Baru Cormorant. New York: Tor. 2015. ISBN 978-0-7653-8072-2.
2. The Monster Baru Cormorant. New York: Tor. 2018. ISBN 978-0-7653-8074-6.
3. The Tyrant Baru Cormorant. New York: Tor. 2020. ISBN 978-0-7653-8076-0.
4. Fourth novel, forthcoming

==== Other novels ====
- Exordia. New York: Tor. 2024. ISBN 978-1-250-23301-1.

=== Short fiction ===
Title	Year	First published	Reprinted/collected
"The Traitor Baru Cormorant, Her Field-General, and their Wounds"	2011	Beneath Ceaseless Skies, December 2011	
"Worth of Crows"	2012	Beneath Ceaseless Skies, September 2012	
"Cronus and the Ships"	2013	Analog Science Fiction and Fact, July/August 2013	
"A Plant (Whose Name is Destroyed)"	2013	Strange Horizons, August 2013	
"Never Dreaming (In Four Burns)"	2013	Clarkesworld, November 2013	
"Testimony Before an Emergency Session of The Naval Cephalopod Command"	2013	Drabblecast, December 2013	
"Morrigan in the Sunglare"	2014	Clarkesworld, March 2014	The Year's Best Military & Adventure SF & Space Opera, edited by David Afsharirad
"Sekhmet Hunts the Dying Gnosis: A Computation"	2014	Beneath Ceaseless Skies, March 2014	
"Kumara"	2014	Escape Pod, March 2014	
"Our Fire, Given Freely"	2014	Beneath Ceaseless Skies, April 2014	
"A Tank Only Fears Four Things"	2014	Lightspeed, May 2014	
"Anna Saves Them All"	2014	Shimmer, September 2014	
"Economies of Force"	2014	Apex Magazine, September 2014	
"Wizard, Cabalist, Ascendant"	2014	Upgraded, edited by Neil Clarke, September 2014	
"Three Bodies at Mitanni"	2015	Analog Science Fiction and Fact, June 2015	The Best Science Fiction of the Year: Volume 1 (2016), edited by Neil Clarke The Best American Science Fiction and Fantasy 2016, edited by John Joseph Adams The Final Frontier (2018), edited by Neil Clarke
"Please Undo this Hurt"	2015	Tor.com, September 2015	
"Morrigan in Shadow"	2015	Clarkesworld, December 2015	The Year's Best Military & Adventure SF 2015, edited by David Afsharirad
"Laws of Night and Silk"	2016	Beneath Ceaseless Skies, May 2016	The Best Science Fiction and Fantasy: Volume Eleven (2017), edited by Jonathan Strahan
"The Final Order"	2020	From a Certain Point of View: The Empire Strikes Back	
"Edge of Eternities" (Gamebook story series, Magic: The Gathering tie-in fiction)	2025		

=== Writing for video games ===
- FreeSpace 2: Blue Planet (2010)
- Destiny: The Taken King (2015)
- Destiny 2: Forsaken (2018)
- Subnautica 2
