= Lasca =

Board game invented by Emanuel Lasker

- Genres: Board game Abstract strategy game
- Players: 2
- Setup time: Less than a minute
- Playing time: Varies, chess clocks can be used
- Chance: None
- Skills: Strategy, tactics
- Synonyms: Laska; Laskers

Lasca (also called Laska or Laskers) is a draughts (or checkers) variant, invented by the second World Chess Champion Emanuel Lasker (1868–1941). Lasca is derived from English draughts (American checkers) and the Russian draughts game bashni (Towers).

== History ==
Emanuel Lasker became familiar with bashni in the 19th century while participating in chess tournaments in Moscow and St. Petersburg. According to contemporary memoirs, in Moscow Lasker stayed in the house of D. I. Sargin, a famous historian, researcher, and popularizer of board games. By the time he met Lasker, Sargin was regularly editing columns on draughts (towers) in several Russian newspapers and magazines. The mutual influence of these famous researchers on each other is quite obvious, since Sargin is the author of the fundamental work "The Antiquity of the games of checkers and chess", and Lasker's book "Board games of Nations" was repeatedly reprinted.

Public presentation of a new kind of columns draughts was at that time done by a strong marketing company using the brand in the person of Lasker, the current world champion.

In 1911, factory kits for the game of Lasca, including a game board, sets of draughts of four colors and a booklet describing the rules of the game, were widely sold in Europe and the United States.

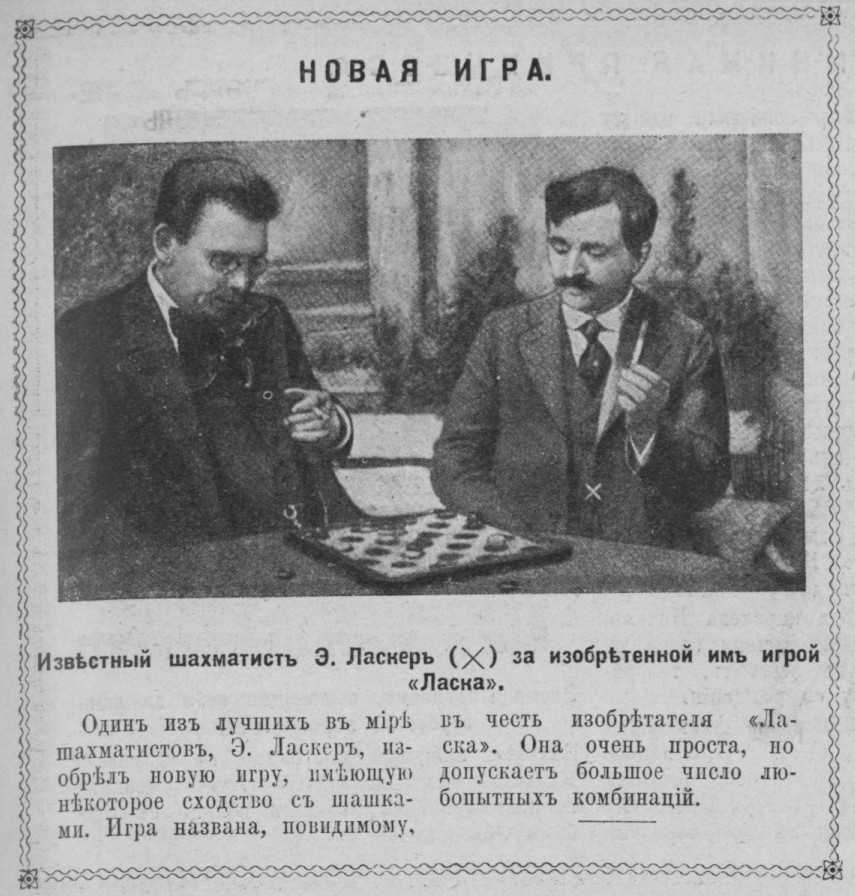
E.Lasker plays his game Lasca. — New game // Ogonjok : Magazin/ — 1911. — № 39. — С. 17.

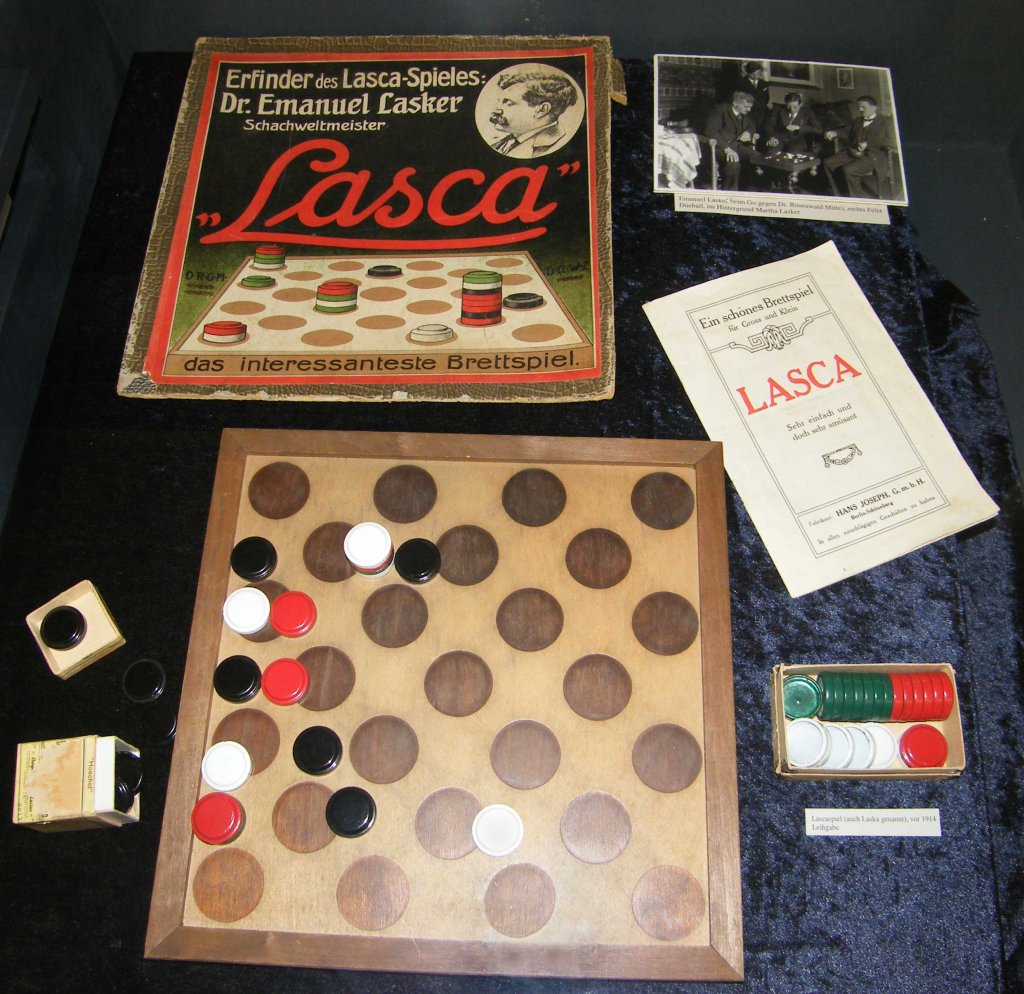
Original set for Lasca, booklet with description of rules and box

== Description ==
The game is played on a 7×7 board; as with draughts and most descendant games, play takes place only on alternating squares, so that only 25 of the 49 squares are actually used. The playing pieces are known initially as soldiers; when they reach the last row of the board, they become officers, with the same ability as kings in English draughts to move and jump backward.

== Rules ==
The major difference between Lasca and other draughts variants is that instead of pieces being removed from the board when they are jumped, they are placed under the piece that jumped them, forming a column. A column is under the control of the player whose piece is on top, and has the move and jump capabilities of that piece (so that, for instance, a column with a black officer on top is under Black's control, and can move and jump in either direction.) If a column is itself jumped, only the top piece is removed to go under the column doing the jumping.

There are a few other changes in the rules, as well. Capturing is mandatory when possible; this means that a clever player may be able to force his opponent to capture several pieces of his color, then capture his opponent's piece from the top, leaving a powerful column composed of several pieces of his own color. A player wins the game when:

- the opponent has no legal move, or
- all the opponent's pieces have been captured, or
- the opponent resigns.
A soldier must jump forward over an enemy soldier, making a column from the two pieces.
A column controlled by an officer (notice the marking) must jump backwards over an enemy column, whose uppermost piece is put under the attacking column.
A soldier jumps over a rival column, and reaches the last row of the board to become an officer (notice the marking).

== Examples, tasks, and games ==
Whites win. Lasca Task by Alexander Sladkoff, Moscow)

Peter Mikhaelsen (Dutch) - Victor Pakhomov (Russia)(1999 г.)

== See also ==
- Bashni
- Emergo
- Draughts
- Tak

== Reviews ==
- Games & Puzzles #44
