= The Traitor Baru Cormorant =

2015 fantasy novel by American author Seth Dickinson

- Cover image for U.S. first edition hardcover
- Author: Seth Dickinson
- Audio read by: Christine Marshall
- Cover artist: Sam Weber (US); Neil Lang (UK)
- Language: English
- Genre: Hard fantasy
- Published: September 15, 2015 (US and UK)
- Publisher: Tor Books
- Publication place: United States and United Kingdom
- Media type: Hardcover; paperback; e-book; audiobook
- Pages: 400 (hardcover)
- ISBN: 978-0-765-38072-2 (US first edition hardcover)
- Followed by: The Monster Baru Cormorant
- Website: www.sethdickinson.com/the-traitor-baru-cormorant/

The Traitor Baru Cormorant (/ˈbɑːru/ BAH-roo) is a 2015 hard fantasy novel by Seth Dickinson, and his debut novel. It was published as The Traitor in the United Kingdom. It is based on Dickinson's short story "The Traitor Baru Cormorant, Her Field-General, and Their Wounds" (2011), which was published in Beneath Ceaseless Skies.

The novel follows Baru, a brilliant young woman who, educated in the schools of the imperial power that subjugated her homeland, sets out to gain power to subvert the empire from within. A sequel, The Monster Baru Cormorant, was released on 30 October 2018. A third novel, The Tyrant Baru Cormorant, was released on August 11, 2020, and a fourth novel in the series is planned.

== Synopsis ==
At the start of the novel, Baru Cormorant is a child living on the island of Taranoke. Taranoke is annexed by the Imperial Republic of Falcrest, called the Masquerade because of the masks worn by its officials. They kill one of Baru's fathers and institute their own rigid belief system focused on hygiene and puritanical sexual ethics. Baru is educated at a Masquerade school, but vows to work her way upward within the Empire and eventually free her island.

At her school, Baru demonstrates extreme mathematical prowess. She is noticed by Cairdine Farrier, a high-ranking Masquerade official. Farrier elevates her to the position of Imperial Accountant of Aurdwynn, a province of thirteen duchies that often rebels against Masquerade rule. Baru uses her financial expertise to manipulate the Masquerade's fiat currency system. This causes rapid inflation and widespread poverty, but crushes an incipient rebellion by Duchess Tain Hu. Eventually, Baru becomes friendly with Tain Hu and other Aurdwynni nobles; she agrees to join them in revolt against the Masquerade. Baru uses her financial powers to grant loans to the commoners, which enriches Aurdwynn and ensures that her rebellion will gain popular support.

Baru leads an army against the Masquerade forces and takes Tain Hu as her lover. After a brief victory, the Aurdwynni army is ambushed by the Masquerade navy. The rebellious dukes and duchesses are all killed except for Tain Hu. Baru reveals that she has been an agent of the Masquerade throughout the rebellion; in exchange for crushing the nobility in Aurdwynn, she will be given rule of Taranoke and elevated to the Masquerade's ruling clique. As a final test of loyalty, the Masquerade committee members ask Baru to kill Tain Hu. They then offer to spare her in exchange for Baru's loyalty. Hu signals that she does not wish to be used as a pawn. In obedience to her lover's wishes, Baru allows Tain Hu to be executed. This choice protects Baru from blackmail, leaving her free to pursue revenge against the Empire.

== Reception ==
The Traitor Baru Cormorant was well received by critics. Publishers Weekly appreciated the "seductively complex", ambitious worldbuilding and the "subtle language" of Dickinson's "compelling, utterly surprising narrative". At NPR, Amal El-Mohtar praised the "crucial, necessary" novel for its brutality in looking "unflinchingly into the self-replicating virus of empire", noting in particular the unexpectedly "viscerally riveting" portrayal of economic conflict. Dickinson has blogged about explicitly addressing issues around gender and feminism, race and homosexuality, as well as imperialism in the world of Baru Cormorant.

== See also ==
- Feminist science fiction
- LGBT themes in speculative fiction
- Colonialism and Imperialism
