= Future technology =

Future technology may refer to:

- Emerging technologies, technologies that are perceived as capable of changing the status quo
- Futures studies (also called futurology), the study of postulating possible, probable, and preferable futures and the worldviews and myths that underlie them
- Hypothetical technology, technology that does not exist yet, but that could exist in the future
- Technology forecasting, attempts to predict the future characteristics of useful technological machines, procedures or techniques
