= Bashni =

Russian board game

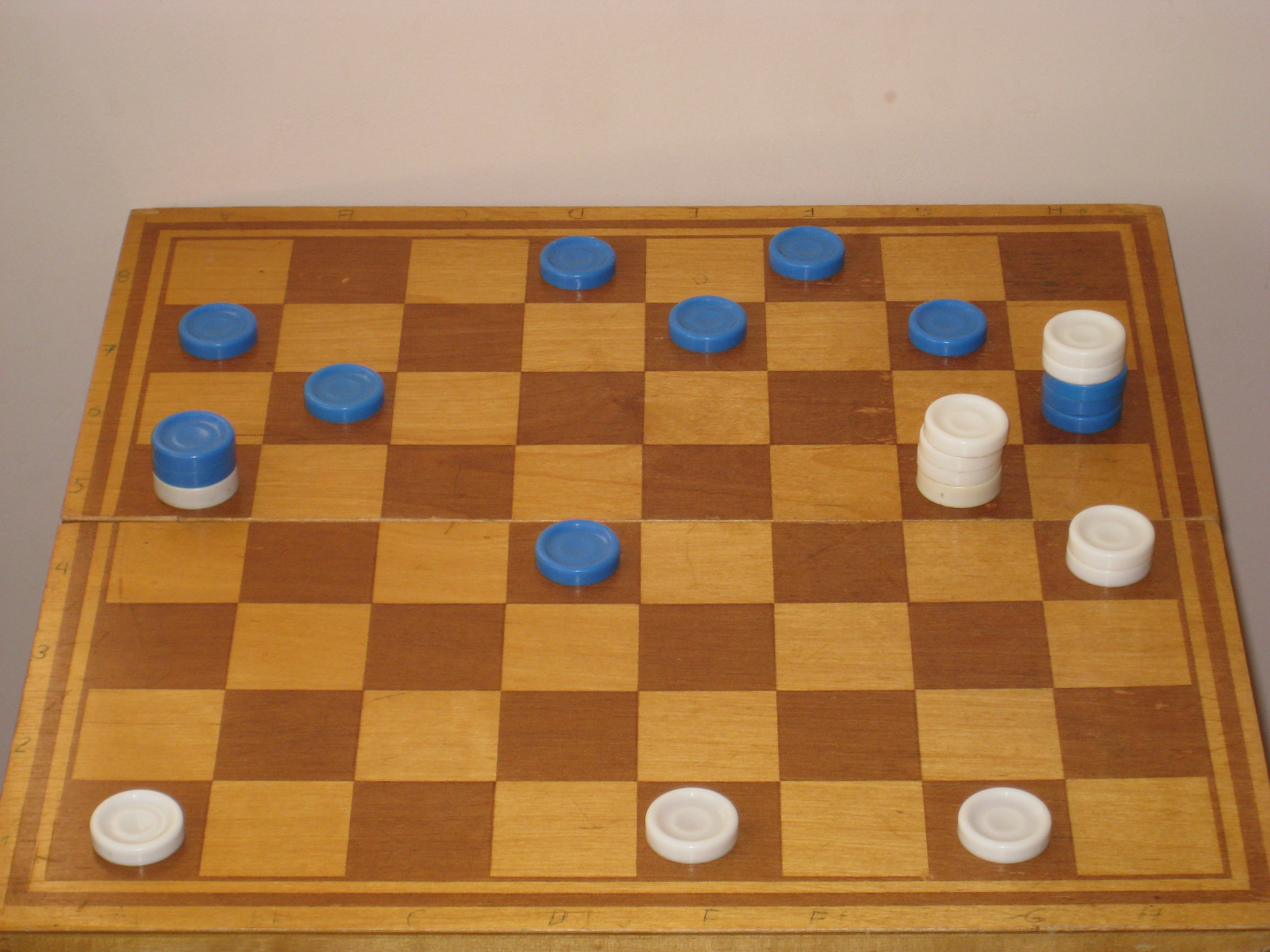
- Genres: Board game Abstract strategy game
- Players: 2
- Setup time: < 1 minute
- Playing time: Varies, chess clocks can be used
- Chance: None
- Skills: Strategy, tactics
- Synonyms: Stolbovye shashki Towers draughts

Bashni (Russian: ба́шни, towers), also known as column draughts, multi-level checkers, and rarer Chinese checkers, is a variation of draughts, known in Russia since the 19th century. The game is played according to the basic rules of Russian draughts, with the main difference being that draughts being jumped over are not removed from the playing field but are instead placed under the jumping piece (draught or tower). The resulting towers move across the board as one piece, obeying the status of the upper draught. When a tower is jumped over, only the upper draught is removed from it. If, as a result of the combat, the top draught changes colour, ownership of the tower passes on to the opposing player.

Based on Bashni, but according to the basic rules of English draughts, world chess champion Emanuel Lasker developed the draughts game "Laska" and, in 1911, published its description. Lasker described towers that can only be "double-layered": i.e. there can be no alternation of colors. He also showed that during the game the number of game pieces either remains constant or decreases. Column draughts are a subject of interest for the mathematical Sciences: combinatorics, theory of paired zero-sum games, etc.

== History ==
It is believed, the first description of column draughts was presented in the article "Towers or tours" of the "Collection of games for family and school" compiled by Valerian Alexandrovich Viskovatov, and published in 1875 in St. Petersburg. A famous theorist and historian draughts Davyd I. Sargin., being the editor of the chess and draughts sections in many Russian Newspapers repeatedly reprinted the article and published its own research pole pieces. One of the most complete descriptions of column draughts is given in his fundamental work "the Antiquity of the games of checkers and chess", published in Moscow in 1915[2]. A significant role in the dissemination column draughts belongs to enthusiasts of the Leningrad production Association "Krasnaya Zarya" headed by researcher table games, teacher of adult education and the promoter of Aleksandr G. Borovikov (23 June 1931 – 8 March 2017 g). A. G. Borovikov for many years (from 2000 to 2015), co-editor of the magazine "Koster" in which he led the column "on the checkered Board" and told a fascinating story not only about the varieties of column draughts, but also other Board games. Yuri Pavlovich Filatov, one of the first initiators of the go-movement in the USSR, highly valued column draughts and actively promoted them.

== Rules ==
- Board. Bashni is played on an 8×8 board with alternating dark and light squares. The left down square field should be dark.
- Starting position. Each player starts with 12 pieces on the dark squares of the three rows closest to their own side. The row closest to each player is called the "crownhead" or "kings row". Usually, the colors of the pieces are black and white, but it is possible to use other colors (one dark and other light). The player with white pieces (lighter color) moves first.
- Pieces. There are two kinds of pieces: "men" and "kings". Both kinds of pieces may be either a simple piece or column. Kings are differentiated as either two normal pieces of the same color stacked one on top of the other or by inverted pieces.
- Men. Men move forward diagonally to an adjacent unoccupied square.
- Kings. If a player's piece moves into the kings row on the opposing player's side of the board, that piece is "crowned", becoming a "king". The piece now has the ability to move diagonally both backwards and forwards to an adjacent unoccupied square.

Example of capture

- Capture. If the adjacent square contains an opponent's piece, and the square immediately beyond it is vacant, the opponent's piece may be captured and placed under the piece that jumped over it and create a column. Jumping can be done forward and backward. Multiple-jump moves are possible if, when the jumping piece lands, there is another piece that can be jumped. Jumping is mandatory and cannot be passed up to make a non-jumping move. When there is more than one way for a player to jump, one may choose which sequence to make, not necessarily the sequence that will result in the most captures. However, one must make all the captures in that sequence. If the column makes a jump over an opponent's column, only the uppermost piece is removed from the opponent column.
- If a man touches the kings row during a capture and can continue a capture, it jumps backwards as a king. The player can choose where to land after the capture.
- Column. Move as man if upper piece is man (man's column) and move as a king if upper piece is a king (king's column). If a man's column touches the kings row only upper piece become king.
- Winning. A player with no valid move remaining loses. This is the case if the player either has no free pieces left (not under opponent column) or if a player's pieces are obstructed from making a legal move by the pieces of the opponent.
- Draw. The game is considered a draw when the same position repeats itself for the third time, with the same player having the move each time, if one player proposes a draw and his opponent accepts the offer or if the quantity of pieces and their composition doesn't change for 15 moves.

== Notation ==
Games and positions are recorded using a special notation – algebraic notation. The vertical columns of squares are labeled from a to h. The horizontal rows of squares are numbered 1 to 8 starting from White's side of the board. Thus each square of the board has a unique identification of file letter followed by rank number.

- Move from e3 to d4 are recorded as e3-d4.
- Move with capture are recorded as c5:e3 (used a colon :).

Position: b8 black circle, d8 black circle, f8 black circle, h8 black circle, a7 black circle, c7 black circle, e7 black circle, g7 black circle, b6 black circle, d6 black circle, f6 black circle, h6 black circle, a3 white circle, c3 white circle, e3 white circle, g3 white circle, b2 white circle, d2 white circle, f2 white circle, h2 white circle, a1 white circle, c1 white circle, e1 white circle, g1 white circle

Starting position. White move first.

1. c3-b4 b6-c5

2. b4-a5 a7-b6

3. b2-c3 c5-b4

4. a3:c5:a7 c7-b6

5. a5:c7:e5 f6:d4:b2

6. a1:c3 d8-c7

For record a position with column Men are recorded as «О», King as «1». A captured opponent's piece is recorded under note «/».

For example:

White: с1 – 1/0000, d6 – 000000, f4 – 0000; black: а1 – 110101/1, b2 – 00.

== Official rules ==
First official rules was adopted by Assembly members of the Saint Petersburg regional Club 16–17 March 2002.

== See also ==
- Russian draughts
- Emergo
- Tak
- Lasca
