= Edge of Eternity =

Edge of Eternity may refer to:

- Edge of Eternity (film), a 1959 film starring Cornel Wilde
- The Edge of Eternity, a 1990 album by Hexenhaus
- Edge of Eternity, a 1994 novel by Jasmine Cresswell
- Edge of Eternity (novel), a 2014 novel by Ken Follett
- Edge of Eternity (video game), a 2021 video game

== See also ==
- Edge of Eternities, a Magic: The Gathering set
- Cosmic Codes: Hidden Messages From the Edge of Eternity, a 1999 book by American evangelical Christian author Chuck Missler
