= Emergo =

Emergo is a Latin word meaning "I emerge".

It appears in or can refer to:

- Luctor et emergo - the motto of the Dutch province of Zeeland
- the board game Emergo
- A promotional gimmick used in showings of the 1959 film House on Haunted Hill
- Apartment 143, a 2012 film originally named Emergo
