= Hard fantasy =

Genre of fantasy literature

Hard fantasy is a term used to describe different types of fantasy literature, especially those which present stories set in (and often centered on) a rational and knowable world. In this sense, the term is analogous to hard science fiction, from which its name is drawn, in that both build their respective worlds in a rigorous and logical manner. However, the term has other uses, and the scholar Misha Grifka-Wander has argued that it is both unpopular and inaccurate.

== Definition ==
In The Encyclopedia of Fantasy (1997), Gary Westfahl defined hard fantasy as a term for stories in which "magic is regarded as an almost scientific force of nature and subject to the same sort of rules and principles", and which "might refer to fantasy stories equivalent to the form of hard sf known as the 'scientific problem' story, where the hero must logically solve a problematic magical situation". He noted that John W. Campbell promoted this kind of fantasy when he was editor of Unknown. In The A to Z of Fantasy Literature, Brian Stableford described this as "probably the most useful application" of the term.

Another example of this type of hard fantasy is Brandon Sanderson's spectrum of hard and soft magic systems. Sanderson describes magic which does not follow strict rules but preserves a sense of wonder as "soft", whereas "hard magic" has rules which the author explicitly describes. Emily Strand has described this as influenced by Orson Scott Card and Arthur C. Clarke's Third Law.

=== Examples ===
Examples of works described as hard fantasy in this sense include:

- "Trouble with Water" (1939) by H. L. Gold
- Magic, Inc. (1941) by Robert A Heinlein
- Lord Darcy series (1964–1979) by Randall Garrett
- Master of the Five Magics (1980) by Lyndon Hardy
- Dragon Cauldron (1991) by Laurence Yep
- Mistborn (2006–2022) by Brandon Sanderson

== Other uses ==
Stableford stated that the term "is used in several different ways", and was originally used by historical fantasy writers in the late 1980s to describe works that were "scrupulously faithful to historical and anthropological data" outside having some magical or mythic plot elements. He names Christian Jacq as an example.

Michael Swanwick's essay "In the Tradition", subtitled "A Cruise through the Hard Fantasy Archipelago..." uses the term to discuss the possibility of major fantasy works providing a structure for the genre, as hard science fiction does for science fiction in general, and concludes that it is impossible.

Fernando Savater has contrasted "hard" fantasy with "soft" fantasy. He describes "soft fantasy" as "unstructured" and "amorphous", such as Alice in Wonderland and The Dream-Quest of Unknown Kadath. Hard fantasy, on the other hand, obeys and extrapolates from rules; Savater cites the works of Jules Verne, H. G. Wells, Olaf Stapledon, and Rendezvous with Rama as examples.

In the introduction to the anthology Modern Masters of Fantasy, editor Gardner Dozois mentioned a subgenre called "Hard Fantasy" as a "vaguely defined hybrid between Tolkienesque fantasy, technologically oriented "hard" science fiction, and steampunk". Dozois' examples included The Iron Dragon's Daughter by Michael Swanwick, Metropolitan by Walter Jon Williams, and "The Giving Mouth" by Ian R. MacLeod.

The term has also been used to describe fantasy writing with accurate research.

== See also ==
- Hard science fiction
- Science fantasy
- Soft science fiction
- Technofantasy
- Unknown—a pulp magazine dedicated to hard-type fantasy
