= Technomage =

Technomage may refer to:

- A fictional magician who uses technology to create similar effects as magic or combines magic and technology
- TechnoMage, a 2001 video game
- Technomage (Babylon 5), a fictional organization in the Babylon 5 franchise

== See also ==
- Technomancer (disambiguation)
