= Exordia =

2024 science fiction novel by Seth Dickinson

- Author: Seth Dickinson
- Language: English
- Genre: Science fiction
- Published: January 23, 2024
- Publisher: Tor Books
- Publication place: United States
- Media type: Print hardcover
- Pages: 544
- ISBN: 978-1250233011

Exordia is a 2024 epic science fiction novel by American author Seth Dickinson. The story follows multiple protagonists in a nonlinear fashion following a devastating first contact event, and the pursuit of an artifact hidden on Earth that could change the ruling hierarchy of the galaxy. The novel explores themes of consciousness, free will, game theory, Kurdish nationalism, the mathematical universe hypothesis, divinity, and the simulation Hypothesis.

== Plot ==
The story follows Anna Sinjari, a Kurdish refugee and genocide survivor living in New York City in 2013. Her life takes a dramatic turn when she encounters an alien named Ssrin, whose species is the reigning galactic superpower known as Exordia. Ssrin is a rebel attempting to free the species subjugated by Exordia by any means. Shortly after their first encounter, Ssrin seeks out Anna when she is wounded by Iruvage, a member of her species and agent of this galactic authority who has been hunting her.

While hiding from Iruvage, Ssrin reveals several revelations about the nature of the universe; namely that it is an artificial construct with flaws, that souls are real, that there is a heaven and hell, that there is a universally objective inherent morality by which souls are judged by after death, and that there are seven innate drives recognized by all species. Ssrin confesses that she and Anna are bonded by one of these drives, known as "serendure," where their souls are intertwined because of their similar backgrounds and moral choices.

Ssrin leaves Anna after recovering and brings the artifact out of hiding in Kurdistan, which triggers a large electromagnetic event, alerting the world to its existence. Shortly after, a ship from the Exordia is detected decelerating and entering orbit around Earth, deploying dozens of nuclear weapons to create a devastating global EMP. A multinational team of Ugandans, Chinese, and Russians immediately deploys to investigate the site of the artifact. The United States also deploys a team that includes Anna, but arrives on site after the multinational team.

It is revealed that Iruvage and Ssrin have both recruited various members of both teams to assist in their respective causes - realizing the potential of the artifact, and ultimately controlling it for their own purposes.

The artifact quickly begins mutating complex matter around it in ways that enhance complexity, killing most living things exposed to it quickly in graphic ways.

Both teams fight against the influence of the artifact at the site while racing to understand it, while simultaneously under attack by Iruvage.

The humans discover that the artifact is a remnant of the beings that created the universe, and has the ability to help lessen the control the Exordia has exerted on the galaxy by hacking reality.

Another Exordia ship arrives in orbit, with Iruvage telling the human teams that it threatens nuclear annihilation if he cannot get control of the artifact for the Exordia.

After destroying Iruvages cloaked ship with great human cost, the humans take control of the artifact, bringing a wounded Ssrin with them. The Exordia ship in orbit launches 30 megaton cobalt-salted nuclear weapons at several dozen major population centers, and the humans in the artifact take off, and intend to avenge these strikes by destroying the Exordian ship. They are ultimately unsuccessful, but manage to escape with the advice of Ssrin.

== Development ==
Dickinson has said that the story began as a work of fan fiction inspired by the bionicle toy line.

== Major themes ==
The novel discusses, among others, themes of imperialism, determinism, game theory, the mathematical universe hypothesis, divinity, the simulation hypothesis, pink noise, the theory of everything, and the nature of divinity.

== Critical reception ==
Exordia was reviewed in the New York Times, Scientific American, Locus Magazine, and Publishers Weekly.

Amal El-Mohtar of The New York Times Book Review states that "Dickinson uses a host of other characters to scrutinize ethics, fractal mathematics, theoretical physics and the military-industrial complexes of several nations"; and that "the result is agonizing and mesmerizing, a devastating and extraordinary achievement". She goes on to notes that Exordia is also "dizzyingly unsatisfying, given where it ends" and wishes for a sequel. A review by Amy Brady of Scientific American called it "a mind-shredding first-contact epic". A review by Publishers Weekly stated that Exordia was an "adroit alternate history of first contact", and that "with cool alien technology, admirably hopeful heroes, and SFF pop culture references littered throughout, this will have readers hooked."

== See also ==
- Pink noise
- Simulation hypothesis
- Mathematical universe hypothesis
