= Betsy Wollheim =

American science fiction editor

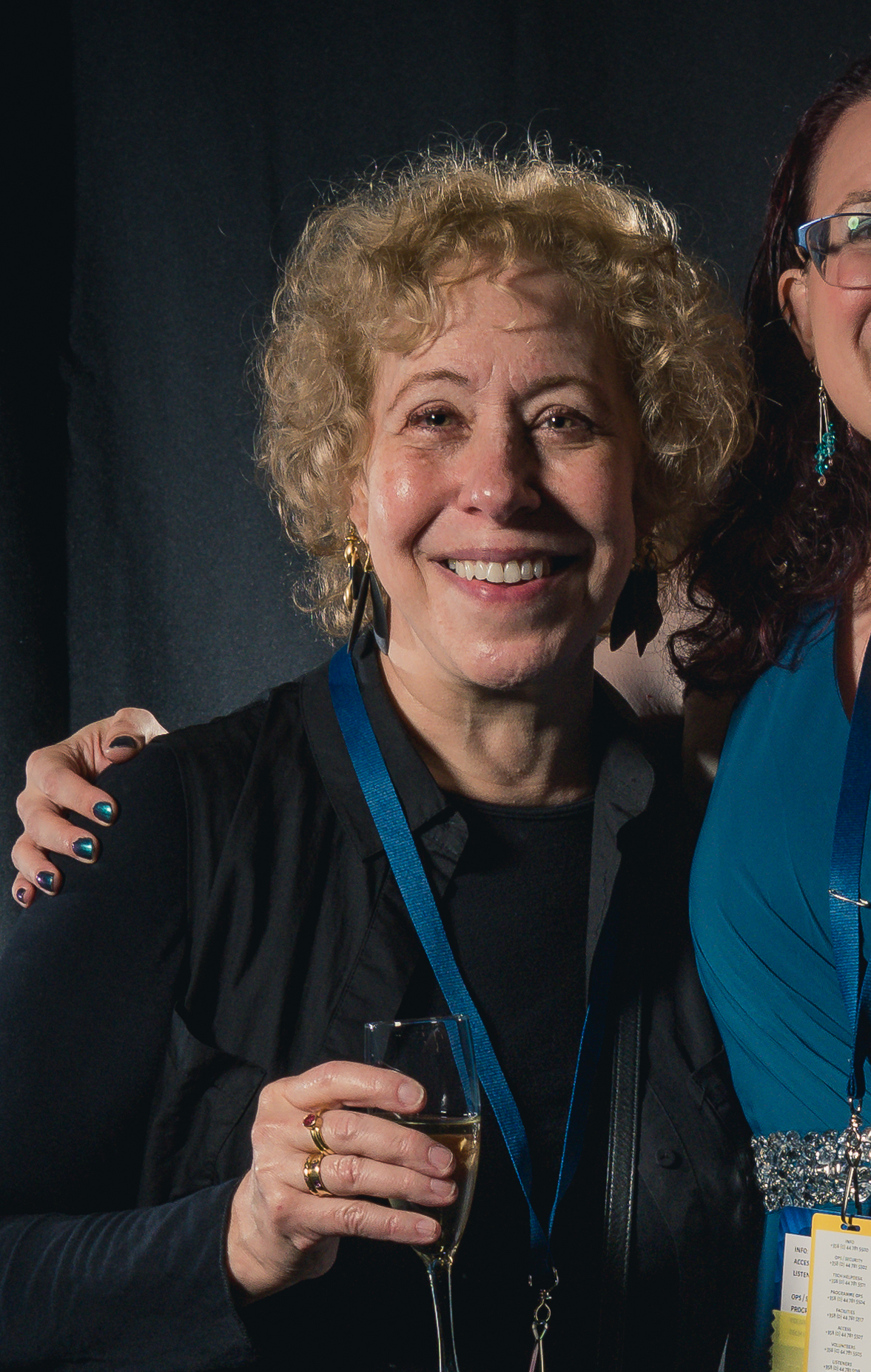
- Born: Elizabeth Rosalind Wollheim; December 5, 1951 (age 74); New York
- Education: Forest Hills High School, Clark University and the Worcester Art Museum School
- Occupation: Editor
- Spouse: Peter Stampfel
- Parent(s): Donald A. Wollheim and Elsie B. Wollheim

Elizabeth Rosalind "Betsy" Wollheim (born 5 December 1951, New York) is the president, co-publisher, and co-editor-in-chief of science fiction and fantasy publisher DAW Books. The latter roles are shared with Sheila E. Gilbert. She started working at DAW as an associate editor in 1975 and took over leadership of DAW in 1985. One change with her leadership was the addition of DAW hardbacks for retail trade.

Her father, Donald A. Wollheim, with her mother Elsie B. Wollheim, established DAW Books in 1971.

== Early life and education ==
Wollheim was born in New York City to Donald and Elsie B. Wollheim. In 1969, she attended Beloit College in Wisconsin before transferring to Clark University in Massachusetts, where she studied English. She simultaneously studied art at the Worcester Art Museum School.

== Career ==
Wollheim has been the editor for many science fiction and fantasy writers, including Patrick Rothfuss, Tad Williams, Mercedes Lackey, Kristen Britain, C.J. Cherryh, Nnedi Okorafor, Saladin A. Ahmed, and C.S. Friedman.

In 2012, Patrick Rothfuss wrote a blog post on nominating her for a Hugo Award, writing a follow-up six months later on her support in helping bring The Wise Man's Fear, his second novel, into publication. That year, she became the first woman to win a Hugo Award for Best Editor.

== Recognition ==
- 2020 Skylark Award
- 2018 World Fantasy Award for Lifetime Achievement
- 2012 Hugo Award for Best Professional Editor (Long Form)
- 1992 shared Chesley Awards for best art director with Sheila E. Gilbert
- 1990 shared Chesley Awards for best art director with Sheila E. Gilbert

== Personal life ==
Wollheim married musician Peter Stampfel in 1982. They have two daughters and reside in New York City.
