= Technology in science fiction =

Technology in science fiction is a crucial aspect of the science fiction genre.

== History ==
=== Emergence and influence ===
As science fiction emerged during the era of Industrial Revolution, the increased presence of machines in everyday life and their role in shaping of the society was a major influence on the genre. It appeared as a major element of the Proto SF, represented by machines and gadgets in works of Jules Verne, George Griffith, H. G. Wells, Edward Bellamy and others. Technology has been portrayed both in positive and negative ways; in some works it is a solution to the world problems, in others, a means of its destruction. Such things as robots and space travel became commonplace in the fiction of the 19th century.

Concepts and illustrations of technology in science fiction have been a significant influence in the formation of popular culture images of future technology.

=== Innovation and fantasy ===
Science fiction has often affected innovation and new technology – for example many rocketry pioneers were inspired by science fiction.

At times, science fiction and fantasy overlap, and use real life or theoretical technology fused with Magic, such as in science fantasy. Examples include Magitek/Magi-tech/Arcanotech (Eberron setting, Final Fantasy), Technomancy (Babylon 5), or Mage Punk (Shadowrun, for example).

== See also ==
- Emerging technologies
- Hypothetical technology
- Mad scientist
- Technobabble
- Technology forecasting
- Technofantasy
