= Edge of Eternities =

Magic: The Gathering expansion set

- Released: August 1, 2025
- Size: 276 cards (81 commons, 100 uncommons, 60 rares, 25 mythic rares, 10 basic lands)
- Keywords: Landfall, Station, Warp, Void
- Mechanics: "Land matters", "Artifact matters", Sacrifice, Lander tokens, Spacecraft, Planets
- Designers: Ethan Fleischer (lead); Jeremy Geist; Mark Rosewater; Megan Smith; Dan Musser; Doug Beyer; Andrew Brown
- Developers: Andrew Brown (lead); Jeremy Geist; Ethan Fleischer; Reggie Valk; Cameron Williams; Eric Levine; Arya Karamchandani; Jadine Klomparens; Jules Robins; Liam Etelson
- Development code: Volleyball
- Expansion code: EOE
← Final Fantasy	Marvel's Spider-Man →

Edge of Eternities is a Magic: The Gathering expansion set released by Wizards of the Coast. It is the 106th Magic expansion and was released on August 1, 2025. The set takes place in a region of outer space outside of Magic: The Gathering's multiverse known as the Edge. It focuses on different ideological factions of spacefaring groups and introduces the mechanics warp, station, planets and void.

== Setting and story ==
The set takes place in the Sothera system, inspired by the space opera genre. There is a religious war being fought between The Celestial Palatinate (White mana) and The Monasteriat (Black mana.) The Celestial Palatinate seeks to revive dying stars while the Monasteriat wishes to accelerate the creation of supervoids throughout the Edge. The story centers around the battle over one particular star known as Sothera, as well as the crew of the Seriema's quest to collect powerful artifact known as The Endstone. The story was written by Seth Dickinson, RJ Taylor, AnaMaria Curtis, Kemi Ashing-Giwa, Rich Larson, and Aimee Ogden. The story uses a chose your own adventure format.

== Mechanics and themes ==
Edge of Eternities introduces the following new keywords and mechanics:

Planet – Planet is a non-basic land type that have the keyword station. They gain new abilities once a set amount of charge counters are added.

Station – Creatures can be tapped as a sorcery to add charge counters to lands and Spacecraft artifacts with the keyword station. Once a set amount of counters are added, permanents with Station gain additional abilities and can become creatures.

Warp – Warp is an alternate casting cost. Players may cast a spell with warp from their hand by paying the spell's warp cost instead of its mana cost. The card is exiled at the beginning of the next end step. After the card is exiled, a player can cast it from exile on a later turn by paying its mana cost.

Void – Void abilities care if a nonland permanent left the battlefield this turn or if a spell was warped this turn.

Lander Tokens – A Lander token is a colorless artifact token with "Pay 2, tap, sacrifice this token: Search your library for a basic land card, put it onto the battlefield tapped, then shuffle."

== Card and product details ==
The regular set includes 276 cards (81 commons, 100 uncommons, 60 rares, 25 mythic rares, and 10 basic lands.) Two preconstructed commander decks were released with Edge of Eternities, Counter Intelligence and World Shaper. Counter Intelligence is a Jeskai (White/Blue/Red) artifact deck headed by Kilo, Apogee Mind. World Shaper is a Jund (Red/Green/Black) landfall deck headed by Szarel, Genesis Shepherd. The headliner for the set is Sothera, the Supervoid. The textless foil version of this card can be found only in Collector Boosters.

== Format legality ==
As of November 15, 2025, cards from Edge of Eternities are legal in Standard, Pioneer, Modern, Legacy, Vintage, and Commander formats.
