= The Slow Regard of Silent Things =

Novella by Patrick Rothfuss

- Author: Patrick Rothfuss
- Illustrator: Nate Taylor
- Language: English
- Series: The Kingkiller Chronicle
- Genre: Heroic fantasy
- Publisher: DAW Books Hardcover
- Publication date: October 28, 2014
- Publication place: United States
- Media type: Print (Hardcover)
- Pages: 159
- ISBN: 978-0-7564-1043-8
- OCLC: 883357313

The Slow Regard of Silent Things is a fantasy novella and one of the companion tales in The Kingkiller Chronicle series written by American author Patrick Rothfuss. It includes illustrations by Nate Taylor and was first published by DAW Books in the United States on October 28, 2014.

== Plot introduction ==
The novella is focused on Auri, a character from The Kingkiller Chronicle and her adventures in the Underthing, a hidden location of old rooms and tunnels under the University. Through the seven days narrated in the book, Auri explores the Underthing, awaiting a visit from Kvothe, a time period that is covered specifically between chapters seven and eleven of The Wise Man's Fear.

== Writing and structure ==
The writing occasionally slips into a poetic flow when describing the little things in Auri's day-to-day life. As Patrick Rothfuss himself says, the book does not do what a "proper book should do", so that it actually does not have a clear plot. The story cannot easily be divided into a beginning, middle, and end, and does not have a proper climax. While The Kingkiller Chronicle books develop a plot and multiple characters, this novella explores one character, describing the day-to-day life of the protagonist, showing her view of the world and the way her mind works.

== Background and publication ==
In 2012, George R. R. Martin and Gardner Dozois, co-editors of a series of cross-genre anthologies, invited Patrick Rothfuss to be in their anthology called Rogues, which Rothfuss agreed to. He initially planned to contribute a story about Auri, who he thought would make a nice counterpoint to some of the other classic rogue-type characters in the anthology. However, after Rothfuss started writing the story, it exceeded the number of words for the anthology and the story went in a different direction from the rogue theme. He then decided to contribute a story about Bast instead, which ended up being the short story "The Lightning Tree" and was eventually published in Rogues in June 2014.

Afterwards, Rothfuss resumed his work on the third book of the trilogy, The Doors of Stone, but the half-unfinished story about Auri tickled him and eventually he went back to finish it. When he put the finishing touches on the story in February 2013, he came up with the working title The Weight of Her Desire, a phrase that appears in the first and last chapters of the book. Encouraged by feedback from his friend and mathemusician Vi Hart, he presented the story to his agent and then his editor, who were enthusiastic about it.

Rothfuss introduced the story to his friend and illustrator Nate Taylor and asked him to create illustrations for the book. Rothfuss was specific about having no explicit pictures of Auri or any of the rooms in the Underthing. It took about two months to finalize the illustrations. The story was eventually published as the standalone novella The Slow Regard of Silent Things in November 2014.

The character of Auri was partially inspired by real life tunnel dweller Tunnel Bob from Madison, Wisconsin.

== Reception ==
The book debuted at number two position in the New York Times Best Seller Hardcover Fiction list approximately three weeks after its release. It spent a month on the list before falling out of the top 15.

The Slow Regard of Silent Things received positive reviews from critics. Marc Alpin of Fantasy Faction was impressed with the writing, stating that "the number of beautiful metaphors, the authenticity of Auri's voice and the emotions that the story evokes are as strong as we'd expect". Alister Davison of Starbust Magazine writes: "It is wonderfully written, the prose verging on poetic in places... There's a sense that Rothfuss has chosen every one of those words with great care and precision, using them to tell a story that's lyrical, heart-felt and unique".

Gizmodo calculated that the book was a victim of the 2015 Sad Puppies controversy, where slate voting knocked the book off the Hugo Award nominations list for Best Novella.
