= Tak (game) =

Two-player abstract strategy game

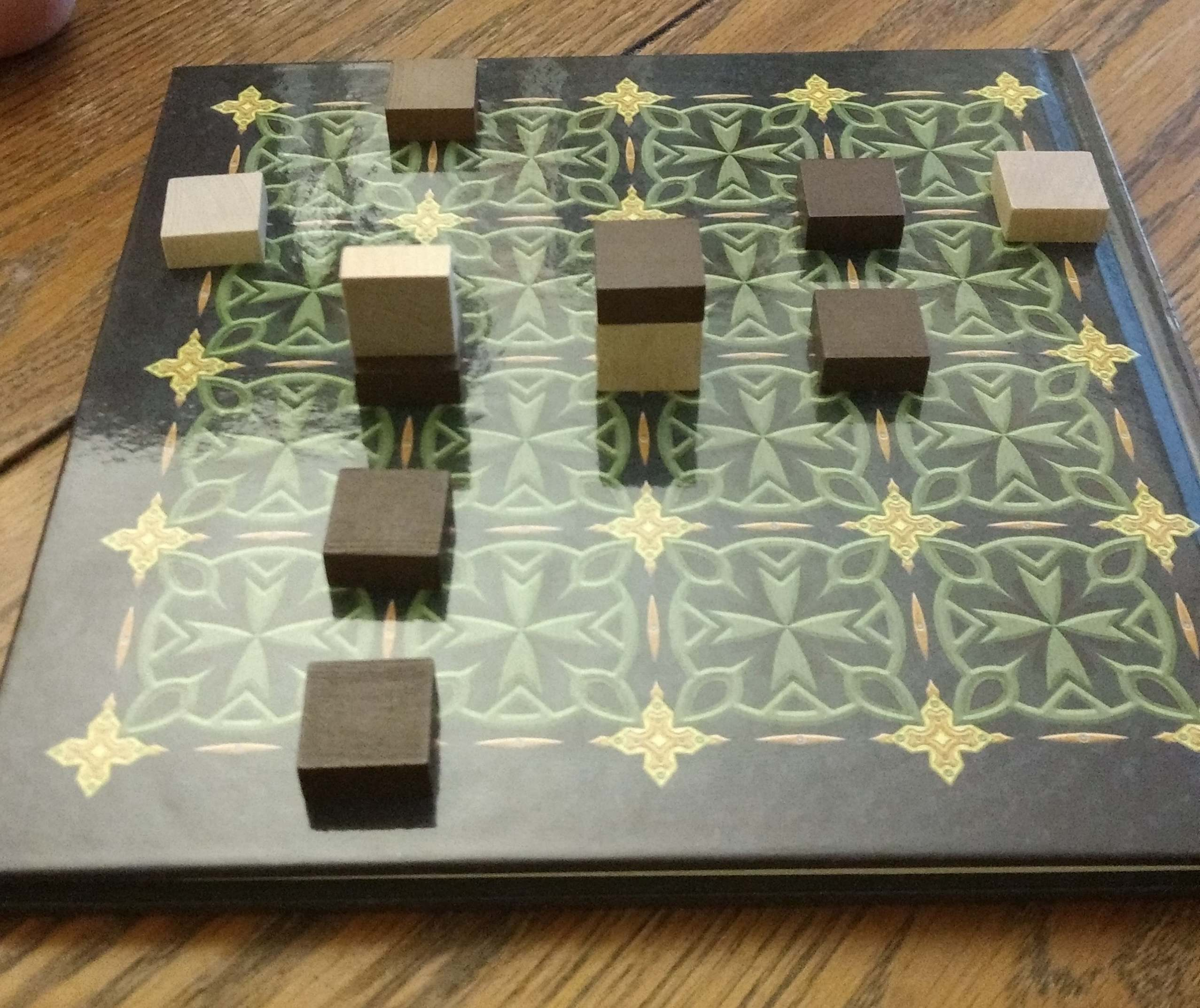
- Tak being played with a "Tavern" set
- Designers: James Ernest; Patrick Rothfuss
- Publishers: Cheapass Games
- Genres: Board game Abstract strategy game
- Players: 2
- Setup time: Minimal
- Playing time: Casual: 10–30 minutes Tournament: 30–90 minutes
- Chance: None
- Skills: Tactics, Strategy

Tak is a two-player abstract strategy game that first existed fictionally within Patrick Rothfuss's fantasy trilogy, The Kingkiller Chronicle, before being brought to life by James Ernest in collaboration with Rothfuss, and published by Cheapass Games in 2016. In 2021, Tak was incorporated as an event in the international Mind Sports Olympiad.

In Tak, players aim to connect two opposite edges of the board with pieces called "stones" and create a road. Players take turns placing their own stones and building a road while blocking and capturing their opponent's stones. The vertical stacking and unstacking of stones gives a three dimensional element to the game play.

== Rules ==
=== Setup ===
Tak is played on a square gameboard of various lengths. The board begins empty. The number of stones available to each player depends on the size of the board. The stone count for each size as set by the rules is listed below.

Board size	3x3	4x4	5x5	6x6	7x7	8x8
Normal pieces	10	15	21	30	40	50
Capstone	0	0	1	1	2	2

Similar to the conventions of chess, Tak game pieces, referred to as "stones", are divided into white and black sets. The players are often referred to as "White" and "Black." Tak sets, however, are available in a variety of colors and styles. Aesthetically, the capstone shape varies among different sets, while flat and standing stones are simple, stackable pieces. (Note: Stones and Capstones often come in a matching style, although the pieces only have to meet differing color standards and stackability requirements. Players must also have a way to distinguish between capstones and normal stones.)

=== Opening turn ===
Players determine randomly who starts the first game, and alternate the first move for future games. In competitive play, white plays first.

All Tak games start with an empty field. On each player's first turn, they must place one of their opponent's flat stones on any empty space on the board. Play then proceeds normally with players controlling their own pieces.

=== Standard turn ===
After the first turn, players must either place a stone on the board or move a stone or stack under their control. Passing is not allowed.

==== Placement ====
On their turn, players may place one stone from their reserve onto an empty spot on the board. There are three stone types that can be placed:

- Flat stones are "normal" stones played "flat" face down on the board. Flat stones can be stacked upon by either player by moving their stones already on the board. Flat stones count as part of a road.
- Standing stones are "normal" stones played "standing" on their edge. Standing stones cannot be stacked upon except by a capstone, but they do not count as part of a road. Standing stones are also commonly called "walls".
- Capstones are the most powerful pieces, as they count towards a road and cannot be stacked upon by any piece. The capstone can also move onto a standing stone and flatten it into a flat stone. Both the opponent's standing stones and the player's standing stones can be flattened in this manner.

==== Movement ====
A player may move a single piece or a stack of pieces they control. A stack is made when a player moves a stone on top of any number of flat stones of any color. The stone on top of a stack determines which player has control of that entire stack. All stones move orthogonally in a straight line on the board. There is no diagonal movement.

A player can also move a whole stack in addition to single stones. A stack can be moved like a single stone, moved in its entirety one space orthogonally (North, South, East, or West), or it can move several spaces orthogonally by breaking the stack and placing one or more flat stones onto the squares being moved onto. The player can leave any number of stones, including zero, on the starting space, but must place at least one piece for each subsequent move. Each subsequent move must be in the same direction. There is no height limit for stacks, but the amount of stones a player can remove from the stack and move is set by the "carry limit" of the board. The carry limit of the board is determined by the dimensions of the board. For example, if the stack was on a 5x5 board, the carry limit of the stack would be five.

Because standing stones and capstones cannot be stacked upon, there are no stacks with these pieces at the bottom or in the middle of the stack. Both of these stones however can be moved onto other flat stones to form a stack with them as the head. A capstone may "flatten" a standing stone and use it to form a stack with the capstone as its head, but it must do so alone. For example, a stack with a capstone cannot flatten a standing stone by moving as a stack onto the standing stone, but a stack can be used to move a capstone across the board so that the capstone alone moves to flatten the standing stone as the final movement.

=== Endgame conditions ===
A completed "road" in black

The primary goal of Tak is to build a road from any edge of the board to the opposite edge. This can be accomplished using flat stones or capstones. Standing stones do not count as part of a road. When a road is built, the owner of the road is declared the winner. Roads do not have to be in a straight line, but stones can only connect when they are orthogonally adjacent (North, South, East, West) to one another. Stones cannot connect diagonally.

If a player makes a move that results in a winning road for both players, the active player wins. This is called the Dragon clause, or a double road.

If a road has not been built by either player, and the board is either fully covered or one player has run out of stones, the game ends and the flat stones of each player are counted. The player with the most flats wins. This is called a "flat win." Standing stones and capstones do not count, nor do captive stones underneath a stack regardless of the owner.

If the flat count is equal when the game has gone to a flat decision a draw is declared.

=== Terminology ===
There are several terms used to describe different aspects of Tak and its states of play. These terms are distributed by the USTak Association.

Roads

Roads are lines of flat stones, or flat stones and capstones that connect orthogonally from one side of the board to the opposite side. The first player to complete a road wins the game.

Flat stones

Often simply called "flats", these pieces lie flat on the board, may be stacked on top of each other, and count as part of a player's "road".

Standing stones

Commonly called "walls", these are flat stones placed standing up on their narrowest side. Standing stones do not count as part of a player's road, and are used to block another player's road. Standing stones can stack on top of flat stones, and can be "flattened" or "crushed" by a "capstone." Flattening a standing stone turns it into a captive flat stone.

Capstones

Capstones are a unique stones that can capture and flatten enemy walls, spread as normal pieces, cannot be captured (even by other capstones), and count towards roads.

Stack

Stacks are formed whenever a stone captures another stone, adding to the number of stones on that space in a vertical manner.

Tak

"Tak" is called when the player is one move away from completing a road and winning the game, similar to the concept of "check" in chess. Calling "Tak" is optional, but is encouraged when playing against beginners, and can be mandatory when agreed upon beforehand.

Tinuë

Tinuë is equivalent to checkmate in chess - it demarcates a position in which a road win is guaranteed for one player.

Flat Win

When either player places their last piece on the board, or if every square on the board is filled, the game ends. If there is no completed road at this time, the player who has the most flat stones on the board wins. Flats that are captives underneath a stack do not count towards the score in a flat win.

Gaelet

Gaelet is similar to Tinuë, but is a guaranteed Flat win.

Hard cap

A hard capstone is where a capstone is on top of a stack with the same color stone directly underneath.

Soft Cap

A soft capstone is where a capstone is on top of a stack with the opposing color stone directly underneath.

Momentum

Momentum is a term referring to how close one is to winning. The player with momentum has fewer direct turns to complete a road or end the game via a flat win.

== First player advantage ==
Tak has a first player advantage less than that of chess. According to the playtak analytics dashboard, a statistical tool compiling all Tak games played online at playtak.com, there is a 55% first player advantage on a 5x5 board, and a 52% first player advantage on a 6x6 board. Tak also has a low draw rate of 0.91%.

=== Komi ===
Komi, based on Komi from the game of Go, has been adopted by the US Tak Association and is used across most of its tournaments. In Tak, applying komi typically means a certain score (most commonly 2) is added to the second player's final flat count. The effect is that it permits the second player to place more standing stones (walls) during the game with the komi score offsetting some of the negative impact such plays have on that player's flat count. This is intended to give the second player an advantage to counterbalance the first player advantage.

== History ==
Tak's design is based on the fictional game of "tak" described in Patrick Rothfuss' 2011 fantasy novel The Wise Man's Fear. In 2014, Ernest worked with Rothfuss to design a game based on the concept. Initially, Rothfuss was reluctant of the design, but after Ernest showed him the gameplay, he approved of it and launched the Kickstarter.

Following this private unveiling of the game, Ernest and Rothfuss, with support from Cheapass Games, launched a Kickstarter campaign on 2016, which resulted in 12,000 backers contributing more than $1.35 million. The game and full rules were released in 2017. As of 2025, Cheapass Games is owned by Crab Fragment Labs, and Tak is technically out of print with no official publisher.

Since then, the US Tak Association has been founded by fans of the game to promote the game's recognition and its level of play and to host tournaments in person and online.

As of sometime in late 2025 Crab Fragment Labs (Ernest's new games company) is "back in control of the licensing rights for Tak" and are "actively pursuing partners to help us print a new edition" with various resources and items for sale on the Crab Fragment Labs Tak Homepage.

== Reception ==
In the Paste Magazine, Keith Law praised the simplicity and strategy despite criticising some of the fan-fiction elements, concluding that Tak was a "very clever little game". In Abstract Games magazine, Dr. Kerry Handscomb commented that Tak is "reminiscent of mancala" and "exactly the kind of game that ought to be an intellectual pastime in some world." Alisha Karabinus, in NYMGamer, found the game play to be accessible to both kids and adults, and praised its versality. Owen Duffy, in The Guardian, also noted the game's simple rules creating "genuine depth" and applauded the feel of the game as one "invented centuries ago and passed down over generations." Canadian online news site SaskToday called the game "an absolute gem".

In 2021, Tak was incorporated as an event in the international Mind Sports Olympiad.

== Community ==
=== US Tak Association ===
In 2016, Tak players founded the US Tak Association (USTA), a nonprofit organization dedicated to supporting and promoting the game of Tak in the United States and worldwide. USTA has two primary goals: to educate the public about the game of Tak, and to provide opportunities for fair and competitive play to its members. Players can pay to join and become a member of USTA. USTA hosts online tournaments and promotes Tak through tabletop game conventions such as Gen Con.

=== Online gameplay ===
Tak is available to play for free online through playtak.com, where players can play Tak against other human players or against NPC opponents.

== See also ==
- Abstract strategy game
- Connection game
- Emergo
- Hex
- Mancala
