= Lyndon Hardy =

American physicist and author (born 1941)

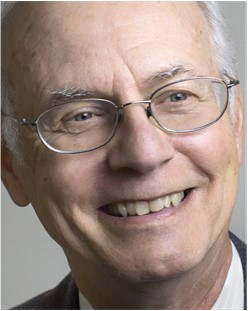
- Lyndon Hardy (2016)
- Born: April 16, 1941 (age 85); Los Angeles, California
- Occupation: Writer
- Writing career
- Period: 1980–1988 and 2016–present
- Genre: Fantasy
- Website: alodar.com

Lyndon Mauriece Hardy (born April 16, 1941) is an American physicist, fantasy author, and business owner.

== Biography ==
Hardy was born on April 16, 1941, in Los Angeles to Leonard and Zell (née Smith) Hardy.

He attended the California Institute of Technology as an undergraduate and the University of California Berkeley for his Ph.D.

In 1961, Hardy masterminded the Great Rose Bowl Hoax, in which Caltech students rearranged the cards used by Washington to spell out words during halftime.

In his college years, he became fascinated with fantasy literature. In addition to being a fantasy author, he worked for 30 years at the aerospace company TRW, and started a computer consulting company named Alodar Systems Inc. that, among other things, helped develop intelligence tools for medical research and enterprise resource planning software for small businesses. He is married and has two daughters.

Hardy is a member of the Science Fiction Writers of America. His primary work of fiction is the Magic by the Numbers series, published 1980–1988 and 2017–2023.

== Bibliography ==
=== Magic by the Numbers ===
1. Master of the Five Magics (1980)
2. Secret of the Sixth Magic (1984)
3. Riddle of the Seven Realms (1988)
4. The Archimage's Fourth Daughter (2017)
5. Magic Times Three (2020)
6. Double Magic (2020)
7. One Last Heist (2023)
