= Technofantasy =

Subgenre of fantasy

Technofantasy is a subgenre of fantasy which has some elements of science and technology. However, the genre does not rationalize their use through scientific or quasi-scientific terms; this distinguishes technofantasy from science fiction and science fantasy. The less realistic and the more "technobabble" any explanation is, the closer the work is to technofantasy. The concept of technofantasy has been described as "destroying the difference between magic and science".

== See also ==
- Clarke's third law
- Hard fantasy
- Hard science fiction
- Planetary romance
- Sanderson's Laws of Magic
- Soft science fiction
- Science fantasy
- Sword and planet
- Technology in science fiction
