= Hypothetical technology =

Technology that does not exist yet

Hypothetical technology is technology that does not exist yet, but that could exist in the future. This article presents examples of technologies that have been hypothesized or proposed, but that have not been developed yet. An example of hypothetical technology is teleportation.

== Artificial general intelligence ==
Artificial general intelligence (AGI) is a hypothetical artificial intelligence that demonstrates a human-like ability to learn. AGI is a machine which could do all human activities with the efficiency of a machine. It is a primary goal of artificial intelligence research and a common topic among science fiction writers and futurists. Artificial general intelligence is also referred to as strong AI, full AI or one that has the ability to perform "general intelligent action". AGI is associated with traits such as consciousness, sentience, sapience, and self-awareness, which are observed in living beings.

== Mind uploading ==
Whole brain emulation (WBE) or mind uploading (sometimes called mind copying or mind transfer) is the hypothetical process of copying mental content (including long-term memory and "self") from a particular brain substrate and copying it to a computational or storage device, such as a digital, analog, quantum-based, or software-based artificial neural network. The computational device could then run a simulation model of the brain information processing, such that it responds in essentially the same way as the original brain (i.e., indistinguishable from the brain for all relevant purposes) and experiences having a conscious mind.

Mind uploading may potentially be accomplished by at least two methods: Copy-and-Transfer or Gradual Replacement of neurons. In the former method, mind uploading would be achieved by scanning and mapping the salient features of a biological brain, and then by copying, transferring and storing that information state into a computer system or another computational device. The simulated mind could be within a virtual reality or simulated world, supported by an anatomic 3D body simulation model. Alternatively, the simulated mind could reside in a computer that's inside (or connected to) a humanoid robot or a biological body.

== Space flight ==
There are many forms of spaceflight that have been proposed that have not, so far, been developed but are thought to be possible. Some, like the space elevator are under active development. Others, like Project Orion, a nuclear bomb propulsion system, are entirely paper exercises. As it happens, Orion is thought to be entirely achievable with existing technology (the obstacles to it are environmental and political rather than technological), whereas the space elevator depends on the development of a material for the cable with a very high specific strength.

=== Space elevator ===
A space elevator is a proposed type of space transport system. Its main component is a ribbon-like cable (also called a tether) starting at or near a planetary surface and extending into space. It is designed to permit vehicle transport along the cable directly into space or orbit without the use of large rockets. An Earth-based space elevator would consist of a cable with one end attached to the surface near the equator and the other end in space beyond geostationary orbit (35,800 km altitude). The competing forces of gravity, which are stronger at the lower end, and the outward/upward centrifugal force, which is stronger at the upper end, would result in the cable staying up under tension, and stationary over a single position on Earth. Once deployed, the tether would be ascended repeatedly by mechanical means to orbit, and descended to return to the surface from orbit.

On Earth, with its relatively strong gravity, current technology is not capable of manufacturing tether materials that are sufficiently strong and light enough to build a space elevator. However, recent concepts for a space elevator are notable for their plans to use carbon nanotube or boron nitride nanotube-based materials as the tensile element in the tether design.

=== Rotating skyhook ===
The rotating skyhook, or momentum-exchange tether, is an idea related to the space elevator concept. It is one of the many proposed applications of space tethers, which include some propulsion systems. The tether is rotated from a heavy orbiting vehicle such that the far end, weighted with a docking station, periodically enters Earth's atmosphere. With the right timing, a fast aircraft can transfer cargo and passengers during the brief time the skyhook is at the bottom of its cycle and stationary relative to Earth's surface.

=== Light sail ===
A light sail is a proposed propulsion system that uses the momentum transferred to a sail by light impinging on it. A light sail could use sunlight to achieve interplanetary travel without carrying large quantities of onboard fuel. Just as a sailboat on Earth can tack into the wind, the light sail can be tacked against the direction of light for a return journey from the outer planets.

At the beginning of the 21st century, light sails were still entirely hypothetical. The Japanese IKAROS spacecraft was launched in 2010 as a proof-of-concept mission for the light sail. It successfully completed a fly-by of Venus using a light sail as its main means of propulsion.

== See also ==
- Emerging technologies
- Exploratory engineering
- Fictional technology
- Futures studies
- List of hypothetical technologies
