= The Kingkiller Chronicle =

Fantasy series by Patrick Rothfuss

- The Name of the Wind (2007); The Wise Man's Fear (2011); The Doors of Stone (TBA)
- Author: Patrick Rothfuss
- Country: United States
- Language: English
- Genre: Heroic fantasy
- Publisher: DAW/Penguin Books
- Published: March 27, 2007 – present
- Media type: print (hardcover & paperback) audiobook

The Kingkiller Chronicle is a planned fantasy trilogy by the American writer Patrick Rothfuss. The first two books, The Name of the Wind and The Wise Man's Fear, were released in 2007 and 2011. The books released in the series have sold over 10 million copies.

The series centers on a man named Kvothe, an infamous adventurer and musician telling his life story to a scribe. The book is told in a "story-within-a-story" format: a frame narrative relates the present day in which Kvothe runs an inn under an assumed name and is told in omniscient third person. The main plot, making up the majority of the books and concerning the actual details of Kvothe's life, is told in the first person. The series also contains metafictional stories within stories from varying perspectives that tie to the main plot in various ways.

== Synopsis ==
The Kingkiller Chronicle tells the life story of a man named Kvothe. In the present day, Kvothe is a rural innkeeper, living under a pseudonym. In the past, he was a wandering trouper and musician who grew to be a notorious arcanist (wizard), known as the infamous "Kingkiller."

The series is framed as the transcription of his three-day-long oral autobiography, where he "trouped, traveled, loved, lost, trusted and was betrayed". Present-day "interludes" concern his life as an innkeeper, with each present day depicted in a separate book.

The series is a secondary world fantasy. It has its own magic systems, mixing alchemy, sympathetic magic, sygaldry (a form of runic magic combined with medieval engineering), and naming (a type of magic that allows the user to command the classical elements and objects), plus others.

== Writing and publishing history ==
The Kingkiller Chronicle is intended to be a trilogy. The books are set in a fictional world referred to as the Four Corners in-universe; the world's official name, Temerant, was revealed in 2014.

Rothfuss began writing the series in 1994. He was inspired by the French writer Edmond Rostand's 19th century play Cyrano de Bergerac, calling it "staggering", adding: "It destroyed me emotionally. Cyrano is proud, brilliant, gorgeous and arrogant -- and he's an ass. The story just breaks your heart." He was also inspired by Casanova's memoirs, crediting Casanova for showing "how interesting an autobiography could be, provided the person telling it has a way with words and has lived a sufficiently adventurous life". The series began in an attempt of marrying the picaresque qualities of Casanova's memoirs with the needs of a story like Cyrano's.

The series had the working title The Song of Flame and Thunder; the name was changed because he disliked it, as well as to avoid confusion with the George R. R. Martin series A Song of Ice and Fire. The first draft of the trilogy was completed in 2000, a draft he described as "a hot mess".

In 2002, Rothfuss entered and won a Writers of the Future contest, which led him to a workshop with author Tim Powers. This eventually led him to meeting his agent, who helped Rothfuss revise the first third of the story—now entitled The Name of the Wind—and sold it to DAW, which published the book in March 2007.

Despite promises that the second and third books in the trilogy would follow on an annual schedule, revisions to the second book, including work to bring in the frame narrative and introduce characters that weren't in the original draft, caused delays. The Wise Man's Fear was released in 2011, topping the New York Times bestseller list.

In 2017, Rothfuss said that his editor and publisher Betsy Wollheim hadn't liked his proposed title, The Doors of Stone, for the third novel, but that it had "by popular consensus" become the "de facto title", after which she accepted it. The Doors of Stone is unreleased as of 2026, a point of contention online. Rothfuss has said that the book would "conclude Kvothe's story", closing off the current arc, but that further stories in the world of Temerant would be forthcoming. He also said that the book presented challenges different from The Wise Man's Fear. In 2020, Rothfuss's publisher and editor Betsy expressed frustration with the delay, stating she had not read "a word" of the book nine years on. She published The Narrow Road Between Desires in 2023.

In 2021, Rothfuss apologized for the long delay in releasing The Doors of Stone, citing issues in his personal life and his mental health as reasons.

== The books ==
The Kingkiller Chronicle is a projected trilogy:

- The Name of the Wind (2007)
- The Wise Man's Fear (2011)
- The Doors of Stone

=== Related works ===
- "How Old Holly Came to Be", an experimental short story, was published in Unfettered (2013), edited by Shawn Speakman.
- The Lightning Tree, a novella, was published in Rogues (2014), edited by George R. R. Martin & Gardner Dozois. The Lightning Tree takes place in the frame setting of The Kingkiller Chronicle, and includes characters from the trilogy, centered around the character of Bast.
- The Slow Regard of Silent Things (2014, ISBN 978-0756410438), a novella focusing on a secondary character that appears in The Kingkiller Chronicle's main plot.
- The Narrow Road Between Desires (2023, ISBN 978-0756419172), a novella centered on the character Bast (a revision and expansion of The Lightning Tree).

In 2012, Rothfuss sold three other books to his publisher, DAW. He has discussed a standalone novel, centered on a legendary figure in the world, with the working title The Tale of Laniel Young-Again. The project was two-thirds complete when it was shelved to focus on The Doors of Stone.

== In other media ==
=== Film and television ===
In July 2013, 20th Century Fox optioned The Kingkiller Chronicle for a TV series. The production team included Arnon Milchan, Andrew Plotkin, Brad Weston, and Robert Lawrence, with Eric Heisserer writing the pilot episode and series bible, and executive producing it. Heisserer shopped the project in 2014, but announced he'd left the project in 2015. Two years later in October, the rights to the books expired and were reverted to Rothfuss. At the same time, Rothfuss announced that Lionsgate would be involved in adapting the series through a film, TV series, and video game. Hamilton creator Lin-Manuel Miranda was attached to serve as executive producer of the television series, along with John Rogers, Jennifer Court, Robert Lawrence, and Rothfuss, with music composed by Miranda. Showtime began developing the series as of October 2017, but ended their involvement two years later in September, causing the rights to return to Lionsgate TV, which is shopping it around. In 2022, Miranda confirmed he had exited the project.

Lindsey Beer was hired to write the screenplay for the film in 2016, while Sam Raimi was announced as the director in 2018, one of several who reportedly sought the role.

=== Games ===
The metafictional strategic board game Tak: A Beautiful Game was released by Rothfuss and Cheapass Games in 2016 and designed by James Ernest. In 2019, Cheapass Games, including Tak, was sold to Greater Than Games. In March 2021, Greater Than Games re-released Tak: A Beautiful Game (2nd Edition) under its own brand, with new box art and board designs co-created with Rothfuss. There are no differences in the rules between the original and second edition.

== Reception ==
The series has received critical acclaim. George R. R. Martin called The Wise Man's Fear his favorite fantasy novel of 2011, and said he wished he had written it. Authors such as Brandon Sanderson, Ursula K. Le Guin, Robin Hobb, Tad Williams, Anne McCaffrey, and Michael Chabon have expressed their admiration for the series. Lin-Manuel Miranda credited the books for inspiring a song in his show Hamilton, as well as a story beat in the Walt Disney film Moana. The game designer Ron Gilbert called the series the best fantasy he'd ever read.

The Wise Man's Fear topped The New York Times bestseller list, and the spin-off novella The Slow Regard of Silent Things spent a month on the same before dropping to the extended list.

The band Nightwish's song "Edema Ruh" is named after the series. Their spin-off band Auri is named, in part, after a character.

Rothfuss has spoken positively of fan fiction of the series, saying that he's looked forward to it, and that "when people start writing fan fiction about your stuff, it shows that your writing has attained a level of popularity".
