= The Name of the Wind =

2007 fantasy novel by Patrick Rothfuss

- Cover image
- Author: Patrick Rothfuss
- Language: English
- Series: The Kingkiller Chronicle
- Genre: Heroic fantasy
- Published: March 27, 2007 DAW Books Hardcover
- Publication place: United States
- Media type: Print (Hardcover)
- Pages: 662 pp (hardcover)
- ISBN: 978-0-7564-0407-9
- OCLC: 145149268
- Dewey Decimal: 813/.6 22
- LC Class: PS3618.O8685 N36 2007
- Followed by: The Wise Man's Fear

The Name of the Wind, also referred to as The Kingkiller Chronicle: Day One, is a heroic fantasy novel written by American author Patrick Rothfuss. It is the first book in the ongoing fantasy trilogy The Kingkiller Chronicle, followed by The Wise Man's Fear. It was published on March 27, 2007, by DAW Books.

== Writing history ==
Rothfuss wrote The Name of the Wind while working on his Bachelor of Arts in English. He drew inspiration from the idea that he wanted a completely new kind of book without the generic characteristics of fantasy.

A sequel, The Wise Man's Fear, was released on March 1, 2011, by DAW Books.

== Plot ==
The Kingkiller Chronicle is set in Temerant, a large, fictional continent of which the known part, called the Four Corners of Civilization, is divided into several distinct nations and cultures, much of whom follow a faith vaguely similar to medieval Christianity. Coexisting alongside the mortal world is the realm of the Fae, a parallel universe inhabited by supernatural creatures which can move between the two realms only when the moon is full. Magic exists in Temerant, too, but obeys a well-defined set of rules and principles that are only exploitable by those who have trained in its professional and scientific use.

As the novel begins, the reader hears an old storyteller speaking of a famous old wizard called Taborlin the Great, who was captured by evil beings called the Chandrian. Escaping them, Taborlin fell from a great height—but since he knew the "Name of the Wind", he called it and the Wind came and set him down safely. In later parts of the book, characters are often skeptical of such stories. Some kinds of magic are taught in the university as academic disciplines and have daily-life applications (those who can afford it are able to buy magical lamps, for example, much better than the candles used by poorer people). However, most of the population does not have reliable knowledge of the magical disciplines and many still doubt that magicians can truly call upon the Wind. The Chandrian—whose appearance is supposedly heralded by flames turning blue—are often dismissed as mythical bogeymen.

In the rural town of Newarre, the Waystone Inn is managed by an innkeeper named Kote and his assistant Bast. It is revealed that Kote is actually the renowned Kvothe: an unequaled sword fighter, magician, and musician, rumored to have killed a king—earning the title Kingkiller—and caused the present war in which the civilized world is embroiled. Bast is Kvothe's assistant and student and a prince of the Fae. Kvothe has gone into hiding and assumed the identity of Kote to keep a low profile, and one night saves Chronicler, a traveling scribe, from spider-like creatures called scrael, whereupon Chronicler, recognizing Kvothe, asks to record his story. Upon consenting, Kvothe tells Chronicler it will take three days (corresponding to the planned trilogy of novels).

Kvothe begins his story during his childhood, when he lived amongst a troupe of highly reputed traveling performers known as Edema Ruh. His loving parents train him from a young age as an actor, singer and lute player. He does extremely well in all of these as in every other field to which he turns his hand. The troupe acquires the scholar and arcanist Abenthy, who trains Kvothe in science and sympathy: a discipline that creates links from one physical object to allow manipulation of another. Kvothe also witnesses Abenthy calling the wind to fend off suspicious townspeople and vows to discover the titular "name of the wind" permitting this control.

Kvothe's father, the famous bard Arliden, starts composing what was to be the greatest of his works—a ballad of the ancient tragic hero Lanre. For this composition, Arliden starts collecting all the various tales of the mythical Chandrian and tries to get at the kernel of truth behind them—without explaining how this is related to Lanre. This inquiry results in fatal consequences. When the troupe makes camp, Kvothe's mother sends him to gather sage in the surrounding woods. Upon returning, he finds his parents and all members of his troupe dead, and the all-too-real Chandrian seated around the campfire, which has turned blue. They disliked Arliden's researches and came to silence him and everybody else with whom he might have shared his findings. The eleven-year-old Kvothe is on the point of being killed by the Chandrian named Cinder when their leader, Lord Haliax, pressures them to depart due to the approach of some mysterious enemies of theirs.

The traumatized Kvothe, alive but alone, spends three years in the slums of the city of Tarbean as a beggar and pickpocket. He is nudged out of this life by hearing a storyteller recount a story of how the hero Lanre became a renegade after the death of his beloved wife, went over to the evil forces he had fought and destroyed the cities with whose protection he was charged—and then changed his name and became himself the fearsome Lord Haliax of the Chandrian. Before Kvothe can ask more, the storyteller is arrested by the dominant Church on charges of heresy.

Kvothe then resolves to get into the university, whose vast Archives include all kinds of accumulated knowledge, including, presumably, that regarding the Chandrian. Having obtained minimal funds for both clothing and travel, he sets out. En route, Kvothe becomes enamored with a talented young woman known as Denna, a fellow musician. Kvothe manages to enter the university despite insufficient funds and performs admirably as a student, but still faces poverty, as well as rivalry with the wealthy student Ambrose Jakis and the arrogant Master Hemme. A trick by Ambrose results in Kvothe's banishment from the Archives, hampering his research efforts. However, he does well in other fields of study, advancing in medicine and runic metalworking, and gaining loyal friends. Kvothe buys a lute, despite his poverty, and performs at a famous musical tavern to earn money, and meets Denna again.

Hearing reports of blue fire and murder at a rural wedding, he suspects the Chandrian and visits the site. There, Kvothe finds Denna, injured. They meet a local swineherd who tells of blue fire, and later encounter a draccus, which nearly destroys the local town before Kvothe can slay it. He does succeed in discovering why the Chandrian murdered all of the wedding's participants: the bride's father had dug in the earth and discovered an old pot on which were paintings of all seven Chandrian; they came to recover the pot and kill anyone who may have seen it.

Back at the university, Ambrose taunts Kvothe and breaks his lute. In a fit of rage, Kvothe unintentionally calls the name of the wind, breaking Ambrose's arm in the process. As a result of the confrontation, Kvothe is sentenced to further lashing but avoids expulsion. Thanks to his clear magical aptitude, he is also promoted in rank as a student under Master Namer Elodin's tutelage.

In the inn at the present day, a mercenary possessed by a supposed skin dancer attacks the patrons and kills one of them. When Kvothe seemingly fails to use magic to help, the skin dancer dies after the local blacksmith's apprentice, Aaron, strikes the possessed mercenary with a rod of iron. The first day ends when Kvothe finishes the first chapter of his story and the town settles down for the night after the commotion. At night, Bast breaks into Chronicler's room and reveals Chronicler's coming was part of his plan all along. He threatens Chronicler, demanding that he focus Kvothe on the more heroic aspects of his story in the hopes he will abandon his apathy and return to his former heroic self.

In the epilogue, it is implied Bast's fears are well-founded, as the present-day Kvothe is described as just a man "waiting to die".

== Reception ==
Author George R. R. Martin is a fan of the series.

Songwriter Lin-Manuel Miranda has also praised the series, writing "No one writes about stories like Pat Rothfuss. How the right story at the right time can change the world, how the teller can shape a life."

Michael Chabon praised the book, comparing its prose to Ursula Le Guin's. Le Guin herself praised the book, writing, "It is a rare and great pleasure to come on somebody writing the way [Patrick Rothfuss does], not only with the kind of accuracy of language that seems to me absolutely essential to fantasy-making, but with real music in the words as well."

== Awards and honors ==
- Quill Award (2007) – Science Fiction/Fantasy/Horror
- "Best Books of the Year" (2007) – Publishers Weekly – Science Fiction/Fantasy/Horror
- Alex Award (2008) – Young Adult Library Services Association (YALSA)
- Reader's Choice(2008) – SF Site

== In popular culture ==
- Lin-Manuel Miranda has credited the book as the inspiration behind "The Story of Tonight", one of the songs from the Broadway musical Hamilton.
- Finnish symphonic metal band Nightwish wrote and performed a song called "Edema Ruh" on their album Endless Forms Most Beautiful (2015), named after the traveling people in The Name of the Wind.
- Finnish progressive folk band Auri (band), a side-project of Tuomas Holopainen of Nightwish fame, named after a character featured in the series, released an album Auri (2018), which has lyrics based on the content from the series.
- German power metal band Blind Guardian released a song called "Damnation" in their album The God Machine, that makes references to the book's story, specifically to the Chandrian.
- In the reboot Mystery Science Theater 3000: The Return, season 1 episode 8, Crow comments on a scene of travelers with wagons and carts, "Oh, it's the Edema Ruh".
- The electro-pop band Shaed is named after the magical cloak made of shadows in the sequel to The Name of the Wind.
- In the Tabletop games King of Tokyo and King of New York, the Draccus from The Name of the Wind is a playable monster that was released as a special promotional character at GenCon.
- The thematic deck-building game Call to Adventure has a The Name of the Wind expansion which adds components from the Kingkiller Chronicle to the cooperative storytelling series.

== Audio book versions ==
Orion released the UK versions of the audio books of The Name of the Wind and The Wise Man's Fear, narrated by Rupert Degas. Brilliance audio released the US versions of the audio books of The Name of the Wind and The Wise Man's Fear, narrated by Nick Podehl. Another version was released on tape that was narrated by Fred Major for the American Printing House for the Blind.
