= Science fantasy =

Science fiction and fantasy genre

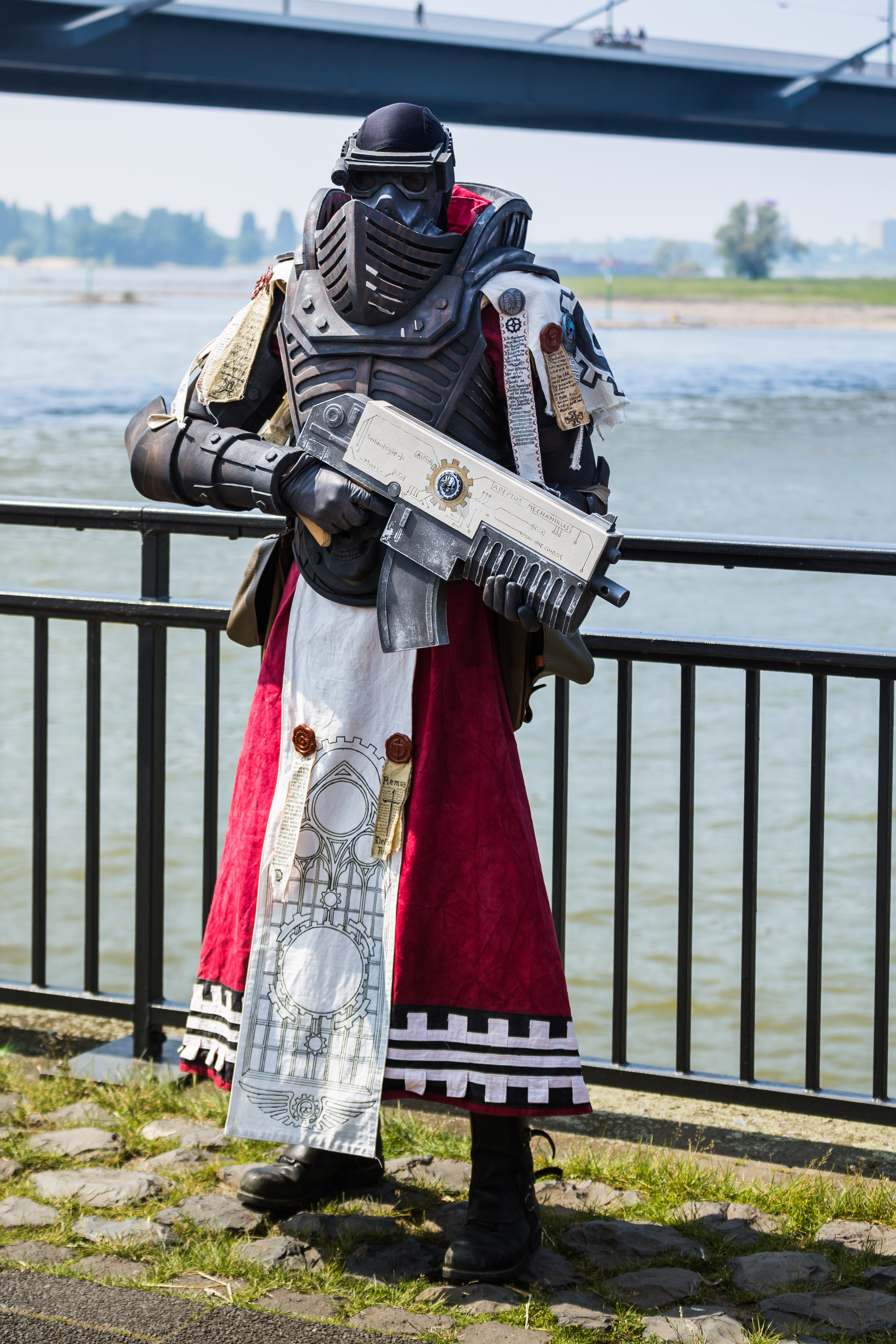
Cosplay of a character from the Warhammer 40,000 tabletop game; one critic has characterized the game's setting as "action-oriented science-fantasy."

Science fantasy (abbreviated as sci-fantasy) is a hybrid genre within speculative fiction that simultaneously draws upon or combines tropes and elements from both science fiction and fantasy. In a conventional science fiction story, the world is presented as grounded by the laws of nature and comprehensible by science, while a conventional fantasy story contains mostly supernatural elements that do not obey the scientific laws of the real world. The world of science fantasy, however, may be laid out as scientifically logical and often supplied with hard science–like explanations of supernatural elements.

During the Golden Age of Science Fiction, science fantasy stories were seen in sharp contrast to the terse, scientifically plausible material that came to dominate mainstream science fiction, typified by the magazine Astounding Science Fiction. Although science fantasy stories at that time were often relegated to the status of children's entertainment, their freedom of imagination and romance proved to be an early major influence on the "New Wave" writers of the 1960s, who became exasperated by the limitations of hard science fiction.

== Historical view ==
The term "science fantasy" was coined in 1935 by critic Forrest J. Ackerman as a synonym for science fiction. In the 1950s, the British journalist Walter Gillings considered science fantasy as a part of science fiction that was not plausible from the point of view of the science of the time (for example, the use of nuclear weapons in H.G. Wells' novel The World Set Free was a science fantasy from the point of view of Newtonian physics and a work of science fiction from the point of view of Einstein's theory). In 1948, writer Marion Zimmer (later known as Marion Zimmer Bradley) called "science fantasy" a mixture of science fiction and fantasy in Startling Stories magazine. Critic Judith Murry considered science fantasy as works of fantasy in which magic has a natural scientific basis. Science fiction critic John Clute chose the narrower term "technological fantasy" from the broader concept of "science fiction". The label first came into wide use after many science fantasy stories were published in the American pulp magazines, such as Robert A. Heinlein's Magic, Inc., L. Ron Hubbard's Slaves of Sleep, and Fletcher Pratt and L. Sprague de Camp's Harold Shea series. All were relatively rationalistic stories published in John W. Campbell Jr.'s Unknown magazine. These were a deliberate attempt to apply the techniques and attitudes of science fiction to traditional fantasy subjects.

Distinguishing between pure science fiction and pure fantasy, Rod Serling argued that the former was "the improbable made possible" while the latter was "the impossible made probable". As a combination of the two, science fantasy gives a scientific veneer of realism to things that simply could not happen in the real world under any circumstances. Where science fiction does not permit the existence of fantastical or supernatural elements, science fantasy explicitly relies upon them to complement the scientific elements.

In explaining the intrigue of science fantasy, Carl D. Malmgren provides an intro regarding C. S. Lewis's speculation on the emotional needs at work in the subgenre: "In the counternatural worlds of science fantasy, the imaginary and the actual, the magical and the prosaic, the mythical and the scientific, meet and interanimate. In so doing, these worlds inspire us with new sensations and experiences, with [quoting C. S. Lewis] 'such beauty, awe, or terror as the actual world does not supply', with the stuff of desires, dreams, and dread."

Henry Kuttner and C. L. Moore published novels in Startling Stories, alone and together, which were far more romantic. These were closely related to the work that they and others were doing for outlets like Weird Tales, such as Moore's Northwest Smith stories.

Ace Books published a number of books as science fantasy during the 1950s and 1960s.

The Encyclopedia of Science Fiction points out that as a genre, science fantasy "has never been clearly defined", and was most commonly used in the period between 1950 and 1966.

The Star Trek franchise created by Gene Roddenberry is sometimes cited as an example of science fantasy. Writer James F. Broderick describes Star Trek as science fantasy because it includes semi-futuristic as well as supernatural/fantasy elements such as The Q. According to the late science fiction author Arthur C. Clarke, many purists argue that Star Trek is science fantasy rather than science fiction because of its scientifically improbable elements, which he partially agreed with.

== Characteristics and subjects ==
Science fantasy blends elements and characteristics of science fiction and fantasy. This usually takes the form of incorporating fantasy elements in a science fiction context. It tends to describe worlds that appear much like fantasy worlds but are made believable through science fiction naturalist explanations. For example, creatures from folklore and mythology typical for fantasy fiction become seemingly possible in reinvented forms through for example the element of extraterrestrial beings. Such works have also been described as "mythopoeic science fantasy". In the genre, subjects are often conceptualized on a planetary scale.

== See also ==
- Dying Earth (genre)
- Lovecraftian horror
- New weird
- Planetary romance (also known as sword and planet)
- Steampunk
- Technofantasy
