= Emergo (board game) =

Abstract board game

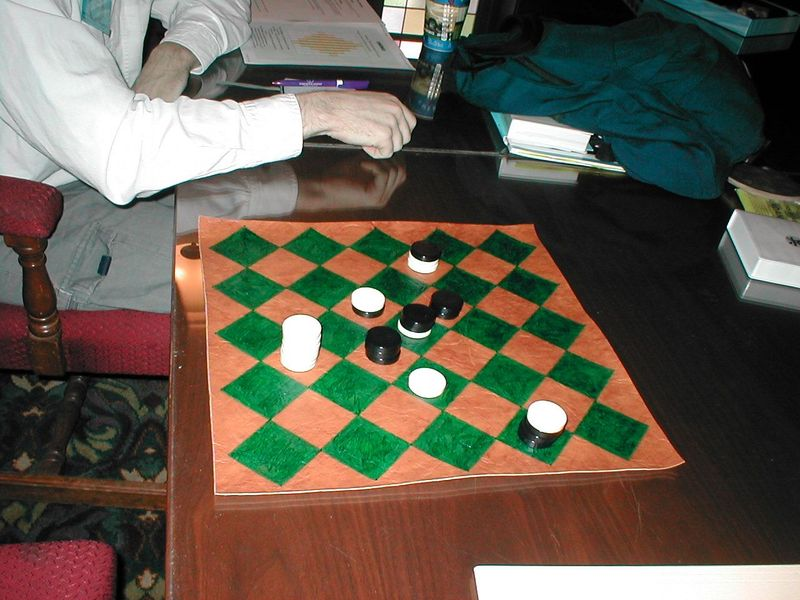
Emergo match (2004) played on an orthogonal depiction of a standard checkerboard

Emergo is an abstract strategy game created by Christian Freeling and Ed van Zon in 1986. It belongs to the "stacking" category of games, or column checkers, along with Bashni and Lasca. The name comes from the motto of the Dutch province of Zeeland: Luctor et emergo meaning: "I wrestle and emerge". The goal of the game is to capture all of the opponents pieces similar to checkers/draughts. Emergo, and all column checkers, differ from most draughts variants because of their unique method of capture. An opponent's piece is added to the capturing player's column rather than being removed. Men can be recaptured from an opponent later on in the game.

== Rules ==
Emergo has two players, Black and White. A 'piece' is defined as a column of one or more men. Columns may consist of all white pieces, all black pieces, white with black prisoners, or black with white prisoners. The top man is called the cap, with all the pieces underneath as prisoners. The color of the cap determines the piece's owner.

Capture occurs by jumping an opponent's piece and landing on the square beyond, which must be vacant for the capture to take place. When a piece is captured, rather than being removed from the game, it is placed beneath the capturing piece as a prisoner. Over the course of the game this results in a decrease in the total number of pieces in play, while the remaining pieces "climb upwards" as they grow taller. If an opponent's cap is captured, revealing the prisoner underneath, the prisoner becomes the new cap and the color signifies the owner. Capture may occur in any direction except by making a 180° turn.

Emergo has two phases to the game. The first is the entering phase and the second is the movement phase.

=== Entering phase ===
The game begins with each player holding their twelve men in hand. White moves first and enters a man on any vacant dark square on the checkerboard, then turns alternate until all the pieces have been placed on the board. If a capture is possible a player must make a capturing move that captures the largest number of pieces possible instead of entering a man. A player may not enter more than one piece per turn unless their opponent already has all their pieces on the board, then they may enter all of their remaining pieces. This occurs only as a result of obligatory capture.

There are only two restrictions during the entering phase. White may not enter a piece in the center square on his first turn, and no player may enter a piece that forces their opponent to then capture it unless that player is already forced to make any capture during their turn. Playing a piece to capture an opponent's piece with your own is legal.

=== Movement phase ===
Once all pieces are on the field a player may move one of their men diagonally one space in any direction. During the movement phase, as in the entering phase, majority capture is obligatory. This means if a capture is possible the player must make the capture that results in the largest number of pieces being added to the column. Once a player makes a capture their turn ends and they may not move a piece until their next turn.

The game ends when a player cannot make a legal move or their pieces have all been captured.

== History ==
Emergo had its origins in a conversation between Ed van Zon and Christian Freeling when van Zon introduced him to a game called Stapeldammen, which he asserted had "very beautiful things" happening in it. Freeling had been vaguely familiar with Stapeldammen, although he knew it by the name of "Indian draughts", but had never been particularly interested in the concept. Stapeldammen is a column checkers game, alongside Bashni and Lasca, adapted to a 10×10 board and utilizes many familiar concepts from International draughts. It lacks only International draughts’ rules regarding promotion and the prohibition on jumping over the same piece twice. When a man reaches the other side of the board, because pieces are not promoted, it is forced to stay there unless it has a backwards capture available to it.

Freeling says that "Ed saw what I had failed to see: there was beauty flickering through the chaotic proceedings in the game. Using thin backgammon men he had me convinced in minutes." Freeling, however, was not so convinced that Stapeldammen's lack of promotion served the game well, and had similar reservations about using international draught's promotion rules. He eventually decided that the problem was not the lack of promotion, but the concept of an initial position and forward direction. He says, "In checkers terms, all men should be Kings to begin with." This abandonment of forward direction and an initial position was the beginning of Emergo as a concept.

Freeling suggested an "entering phase" to van Zon and they played around with concept creating what they would later call an "all kings lasca". In this early rendition of Emergo there were no rules regarding entering a piece other than that capture, if possible, took precedence over entering a man. They began playing this way and immediately ran into an issue.

So we started putting men on the board in our first game, using no other rules than entering a man if not obliged to capture, and capturing in all directions. The movement stage would thus turn into an 'all kings Lasca'. Soon Ed had sneakily managed an anchorman waiting to capture a particular piece that he started feeding (Note: Feeding is a tactic that revolves around the rule of compulsory capture. Since a man must be captured you can force a column of checkers to capture many men and rise very high. If you combine this with a finishing move that captures the top checker on a stack you can free the prisoners and take control of the stack yourself.) around the board. It followed his lead compulsory, like a dog. He eventually liberated a column of ten or thereabouts, and I was still stuck with a similar pile of men in hand – what later would be coined the 'shadowpiece'.

They decided that a phase where one player had all of their men on the board while the other player still had most of their pieces in hand was "unsatisfactory". They decided that if a player had placed all of their pieces on the board, then the other player could enter all the pieces remaining in their hand at once.

They played using this entering rule for roughly an hour, but felt that the entering phase still lacked a "solidity" and was too dominated by tactical considerations rather than long-term strategic ones.

They decided that the problem was ultimately in the feeding tactics, which prevented strong positions from arising for either side as a result of the entering tactics by the other player. They decided to restrict the freedom of the other player to force feeding and instead let it be the result of the entering decision of the other player. This gave the entering phase the current restrictions on placements that force a player to capture a man, and gave it the strategic solidity they were looking for.

The last pieces of the puzzle were the realization that the two players, Black and White had slightly different goals and priorities during the entering phase, resulting in the rule restricting white's first placement, and the board size.

They settled on a 9×9 board because of its odd number of squares and elimination of tric-trac corners.

== Reception ==
R. Wayne Schmittberger praised Emergo in a book on variant rules for board games.

== Trivia ==
- Emergo initially had two versions, the standard game played on a 9×9 square board and a hexagonal variant consisting of 37 hex cells. The latter, known as Hexemergo, was abandoned after play testing because of a winning strategy that was found in correspondence play. The square version does not suffer from a similar problem.
- Of all the games he has created, Emergo is Christian Freeling's personal favourite.
- Emergo has a game tree complexity of ~10^104
- The feel of Emergo's gameplay has been described as "wrestling" in comparison to Bushka's "karate" or Dameo's "judo".
