= Patrick Rothfuss =

American fantasy writer (born 1973)

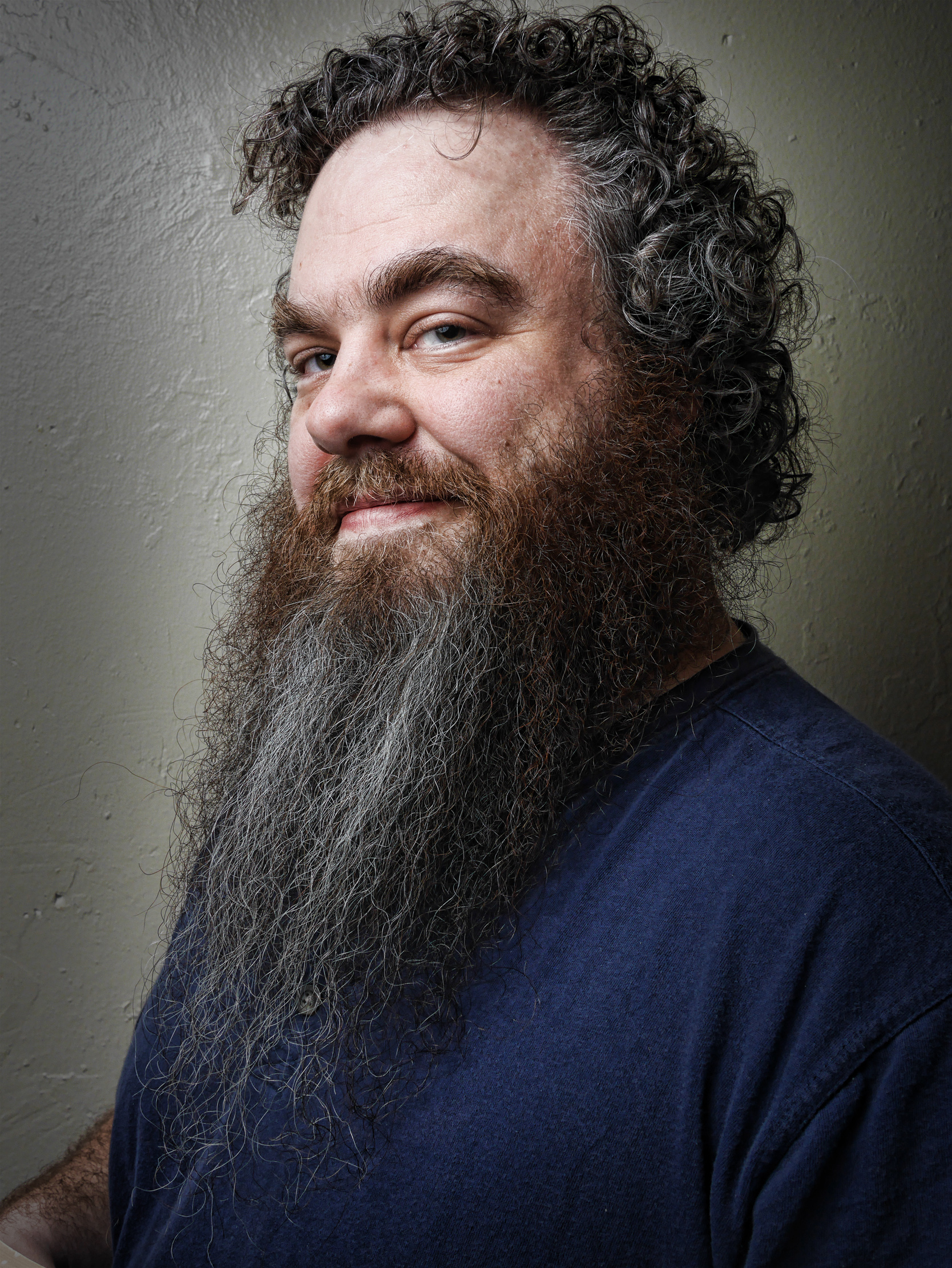
- Rothfuss in 2014
- Born: Patrick James Rothfuss; June 6, 1973 (age 53); Madison, Wisconsin, US
- Education: University of Wisconsin–Stevens Point (B.A.); Washington State University (M.A.)
- Occupation: Writer
- Children: 2
- Writing career
- Genre: Fantasy
- Notable awards: Quill Award (2007), David Gemmell Award (2012)
- Website: patrickrothfuss.com

Signature
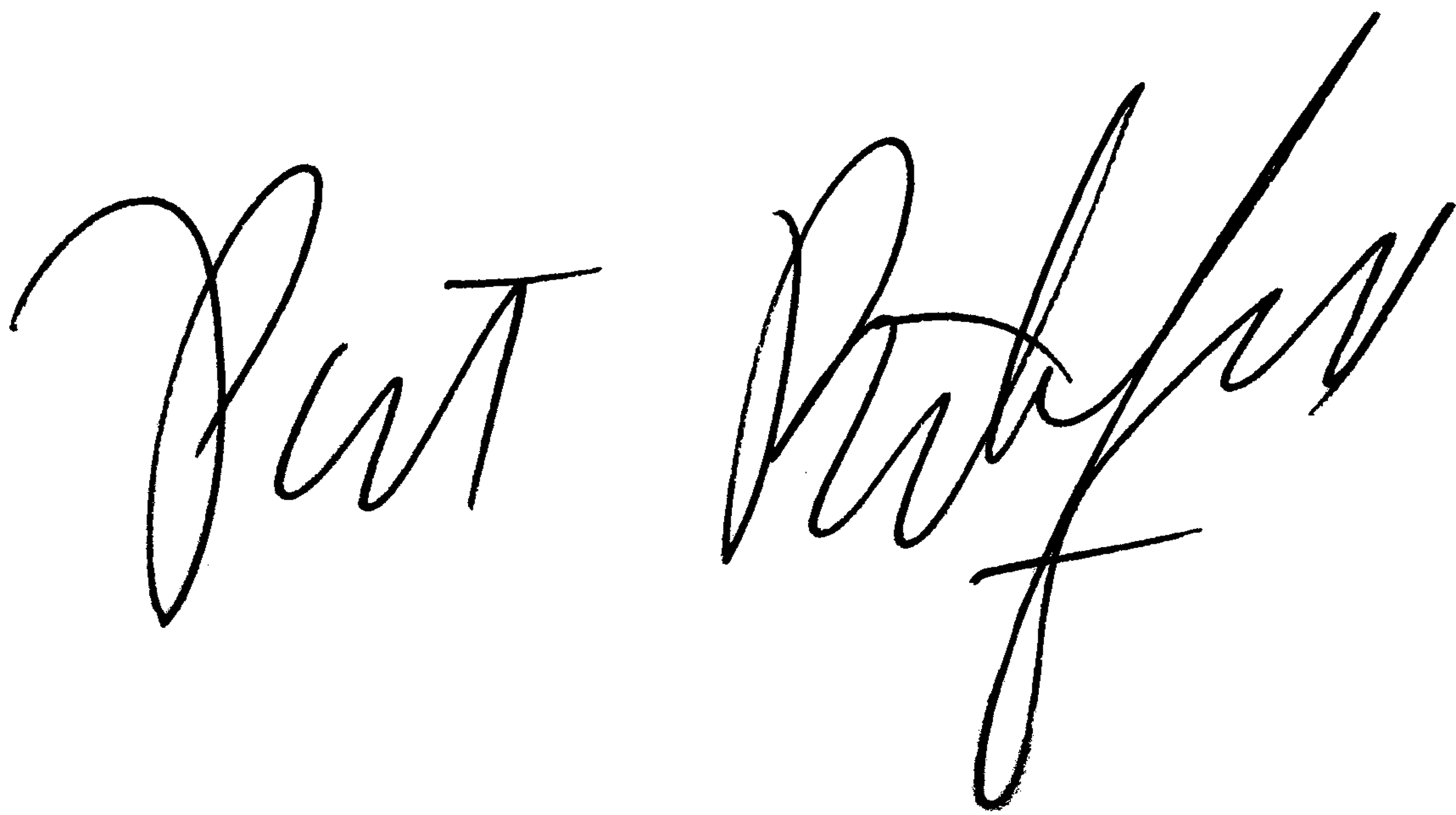

Patrick James Rothfuss (born June 6, 1973) is an American author. He is best known for his highly acclaimed series The Kingkiller Chronicle, beginning with Rothfuss' debut novel, The Name of the Wind (2007), which won several awards, and continuing in the sequel, The Wise Man's Fear (2011), which topped The New York Times Best Seller list.

== Early life ==
Patrick Rothfuss was born in Madison, Wisconsin, graduated from DeForest Area High School, and received his BA in English from the University of Wisconsin–Stevens Point in 1999. He contributed to The Pointer, the campus paper, and produced a widely circulated parody warning about the Goodtimes Virus. He taught part-time at Stevens Point. In 2002, he received a master's degree in arts and English from Washington State University. He won the Writers of the Future 2002 Second Quarter competition with "The Road to Levenshir", an excerpt from his then-unpublished novel The Wise Man's Fear.

== Career ==
=== Writing ===
In 2006, Rothfuss sold his novel The Name of the Wind to DAW Books; the book was released in 2007. It won a Quill Award (for Science Fiction, Fantasy and Horror) and was listed among Publishers Weekly's Books of the Year. It also won an Alex Award in 2008. An illustrated tenth anniversary edition was published in 2017. Its sequel, The Wise Man's Fear, was published in March 2011 and reached No. 1 on the New York Times Hardback Fiction Best Seller list.

The Slow Regard of Silent Things, a novella illustrated by Nate Taylor, was published in October 2014 as a companion story for The Kingkiller Chronicle; the novella centers on the character Auri.

Rothfuss has also released two stories set in the same world as The Kingkiller Chronicle in anthologies. The first was "How Old Holly Came To Be", published in Unfettered in June 2013. The second was the novella The Lightning Tree, released in Rogues in June 2014, featuring the character Bast. The whole anthology was nominated for the 2015 World Fantasy Award for Best Anthology.

"The Lightning Tree" was later expanded and published in 2024 as a standalone novella, The Narrow Road Between Desires. Nate Taylor returned to illustrate it.

Taylor and Rothfuss also collaborated on two The Princess and Mr. Whiffle books, which are "a dark twist on the classic children’s picture-book". The first volume released in 2010, and its sequel in 2013, both by Subterranean Press.

In 2018, Rothfuss was the co-writer of the comics limited series Rick and Morty vs. Dungeons & Dragons #1-4 with Jim Zub and with art by Troy Little. The crossover, between the adult animated sitcom Rick and Morty comic book and Dungeons & Dragons, was published by IDW Publishing and Oni Press. The Rick and Morty vs Dungeons and Dragons Deluxe Edition, by Rothfuss, Zub, and Little, was nominated for the 2022 "Best Graphic Album—Reprint" Eisner Award.

In July 2020, Rothfuss's editor and publisher Betsy Wollheim responded publicly on her Facebook account to an article speculating on reasons why The Doors of Stone, the concluding volume of the trilogy, had not been published. Woldheim noted that she had "never seen a word of book three" and that she didn't think Rothfuss had written anything since 2014, despite having already been paid. While Wollheim partially agreed that readers shouldn't feel entitled to dictate how Rothfuss spends his time, she asked, "But what about the publishers who paid them?". The post has since been deleted.

In December 2021, Rothfuss tweeted that he would "[s]hare a full chapter of Doors of Stone" if his charity reached a $333,333 fundraising goal. Later that month, he added more stretch goals; the largest being for $666,666 to "assemble the Geek Glitterati equivalent of the Avengers and record [the full chapter] for you". He noted that such a goal would take some time. Rothfuss said, "I'm pretty sure we'll be able to get it done early next year. February at the latest." As of May 2026, the chapter has not been released, with Rothfuss saying in April 2022 that the process was "moving more slowly than [he] would like."

=== Underthing Press ===
In December 2021, Rothfuss partnered with Grim Oak Press to create a new imprint called Underthing Press. The new imprint's first project was a reprint of Ursula Vernon's webcomic Digger, which won the Hugo Award in 2012. Rothfuss stated that he had always daydreamed of starting his own imprint. As such, he decided to create Underthing Press when he realized he could not buy a new copy of Digger Omnibus after giving his copy to a friend.

=== Charity ===
Rothfuss founded the charity Worldbuilders in 2008. Since its inception, the organization has raised over $11.5 million, primarily for Heifer International, a charity that provides livestock, clean water, education, and training for communities in the developing world. By 2020, Worldbuilders had raised over $10 million in support of Heifer. It received a Charity Navigator score of 67% in 2025.

=== Podcasts ===
Rothfuss co-hosted a podcast with Max Temkin from 2015 to 2016, with one episode in 2018, called Unattended Consequences. In June 2020, Rothfuss, in partnership with One Shot Podcast, released a mini-series which is set in the same world as his Kingkiller Chronicle fantasy series.

=== Roleplaying and games ===
In 2014, Rothfuss began collaborating with James Ernest to create an abstract strategy game called Tak based on the game featured in his book The Wise Man's Fear.

He was a member of the story design team for inXile's Torment: Tides of Numenera game. He also contributed to the backstory of the game Hero's Song, cancelled in 2016.

== Works ==
=== The Kingkiller Chronicle ===
- The Name of the Wind (2007)
- The Wise Man's Fear (2011)
- "How Old Holly Came to Be" – short story (July 2013, Grim Oak Press), Unfettered, edited by Shawn Speakman. ISBN 978-0-9847136-3-9.
- The Lightning Tree – novella (June 2014, Bantam), Rogues, edited by George R. R. Martin and Gardner Dozois. ISBN 978-0345537263.
- The Slow Regard of Silent Things – novella (October 2014, DAW Books). ISBN 978-0-7564-1043-8.
- The Narrow Road Between Desires – novella (November 2023, DAW Books). ISBN 978-0756419172

=== The Adventures of the Princess and Mr. Whiffle ===
- The Thing Beneath the Bed (2010)
- The Dark of Deep Below (2013)

=== Others ===
- Your Annotated, Illustrated College Survival Guide (January 2005, Cornerstone Press).
- "The Lay of the Eastern King", as part of Clash of the Geeks (2010), edited by Wil Wheaton and John Scalzi.
- Rick and Morty vs. Dungeons & Dragons (with Jim Zub and Troy Little, 4 issues August 2018-January 2019, tpb March 2019, IDW Publishing).

== Awards and honors ==
- Writers of the Future (2002 Second Quarter)
- Quill Award (2007)
- "Best Books of the Year" (2007) – Publishers Weekly – Science Fiction/Fantasy/Horror
- Romantic Times Reviewers' Choice Award for Best Epic Fantasy (2007)
- NPR Top 100 Science-Fiction, Fantasy Books (2011)
- David Gemmell Legend Award (2012)
- Ranked 3rd in "Best 21st Century Fantasy Fiction Novels" by Locus (2012)
