= Holtzman =

Holtzman or Haltzman is a surname. Notable people with the surname include:

- Elizabeth Holtzman (born 1941), American lawyer, NYC Comptroller, and political figure
- Glenn Holtzman (1930–1980), American football player
- Harry Holtzman (1912–1987), American artist
- Jerome Holtzman (1926–2008), American sportswriter
- John W. Holtzman (1858–1942), American political figure
- Ken Holtzman (1945–2024), American baseball player
- Lester Holtzman (1913–2002), American political figure
- Linda Joy Holtzman (fl. 1960s–present), American rabbi and scholar
- Marc Holtzman (born c. 1955), American international investment bank figure
- Scott Holtzman (born 1983), American martial artist
- Shay Holtzman (born 1974), Israeli footballer
- Wayne H. Holtzman (1923–2019), American psychoanalyst
- Wilhelm Holtzman, birth name of German classical scholar Wilhelm Xylander (1532–1576)
- Willy Holtzman (born 1952), American author, screenwriter
- Zac Holtzman (fl. 1980s–present), American musician

== Fiction or other uses ==
- Holtzman effect, a fictional scientific phenomenon in the Dune universe created by Frank Herbert
- Holtzman Inkblot Technique, a psychoanalytical tool
- Schlesinger v. Holtzman, a 1973 US Supreme Court case addressing the War Powers Clause of the Constitution
- Tio Holtzman, fictional character in Frank Herbert's "Dune" universe
  - Holtzman effect, fictional physical effect of crucial importance attributed to the above

== See also ==
- Holtzmann
- Holzmann
- Holzman
- Holz
- Holtz
