= Holzer =

Holzer, also spelt Holczer, is a German and Ashkenazi Jewish surname. It may be a topographic surname meaning "forest dweller" or an occupational surname meaning "woodcutter" or "wood seller", or a toponymic surname for someone hailing from a place named Holz. Notable people include:

- Ádám Holczer (born 1998), Hungarian footballer
- Adi Holzer (born 1936), Austrian artist
- Ashley Holzer (born 1963), Canadian equestrian
- Charles Holzer (born 1969), American equestrian
- Charlotte Holzer (1909–1980), Jewish resistance fighter during World War II
- Daniel Holzer (born 1995), Czech footballer
- Erika Holzer (died 2019), American writer
- Fabian Holzer (born 1992), German badminton player
- Friedl Kjellberg (née Holzer) (1905–1993), Austrian-born Finnish ceramist
- Georg Holzer (born 1957), Austrian scholar of Slavic and Indo-European studies
- Hans Holzer (1920–2009), Austrian-American author and parapsychologist
- Harold Holzer (born 1949), American historian
- Harry J. Holzer (born 1957), American economist, educator and analyst
- Heinz Holzer (born 1964), Italian alpine skier
- Helmut Hölzer (1912–1996), German rocket engineer
- Jacob Adolphus Holzer (1858–1938), American artist
- Jane Holzer (born 1940), American model and actress
- Jenny Holzer (born 1950), American artist
- Jerzy Holzer (1930–2015), Polish historian
- Joanie Holzer Schirm (born 1948), American author, entrepreneur and activist
- Johann Evangelist Holzer (1709–1740), Austrian-German painter
- Josef "Sepp" Holzer (born 1942), Austrian farmer, author and agricultural consultant
- Korbinian Holzer (born 1988), German ice hockey player
- Kristine Holzer (born 1974), American speed skater
- Leo Holzer (1902–1989), Austrian-Czech firefighter and Holocaust survivor
- Marc Holzer, American scholar and professor
- Marcel Holzer (born 1998), Austrian footballer
- Marco Holzer (born 1988), German racing driver
- Marie Holzer (1874–1924), Austrian writer and journalist
- Patrick Holzer (born 1970), Italian alpine skier
- Rachel Holzer (1899–1988), Australian theatre director and actress
- Renzo Holzer (born 1952), Swiss ice hockey player
- Richard Holzer (1923–2021), Panamanian architect
- Robert Holczer (1929–2017), Hungarian teacher and Holocaust survivor
- Robert Holzer (born 1966), German footballer and agent
- Thomas Holzer (born 1985), German racing driver
- Werner Holzer (1937–2018), American wrestler

== See also ==
- Holtzer
- Hoeltzer
- Holtz
