= Polzer =

Polzer is a surname. Notable people with the surname include:

- Heinz Hermann Polzer (1919–2015), Swiss singer-songwriter, poet, and prose writer
- Jeffrey T. Polzer, American academic
- Leopold Innocenty Nepomucen Polzer (1697–1753), Polish lawyer

== See also ==
- Holzer
- Pozzer
