= Xylander =

Xylander is a German surname associated with the German moble Xylander family. It is a Hellenization of the German name Holzmann: "wood" is Holz in German and xylos in Greek, while andros is "man" in Greek. A variant is Zylander. Notable people with the surname include:

- Oskar von Xylander (1856–1940), Bavarian general
- Wilhelm Xylander (1532–1576), German classical scholar
- Wolf-Dietrich von Xylander (1903–1945), German general
