= Holtz =

Holtz is a surname. Notable people with the surname include:

- Alexander Holtz (born 2002), Swedish ice hockey player
- Andrew Holtz, American journalist
- Carl Holtz (1920–2006), American rower and farmer
- Eric Holtz (born 1965), American baseball coach
- Jamal Holtz, American politician and party official
- Jürgen Holtz (1932–2020), German actor
- Hyman Holtz (1896–c. 1939), American mobster
- Itshak Holtz (1925–2018), Polish-born Israeli-American painter
- Kaila Holtz (born 1981), Canadian softball player
- Lou Holtz (1893–1980), American comedian
- Lou L. Holtz (1937–2026), American football coach
- Mark Holtz (1945–1997), American broadcaster
- Mike Holtz (born 1972), American baseball player
- Pat Holtz, Scottish pool player
- Sabine Holtz (born 1959), German historian
- Skip Holtz (born 1964), American football coach; son of football coach Lou
- Stefan Holtz (born 1981), German canoer
- Tenen Holtz (1877–1971), Russian actor
- Thomas R. Holtz, Jr., American palaeontologist
- Vera Holtz (born 1953), Brazilian actress
- Viktor Holtz (1846–1919), German educator and pioneer of German-Japanese academic and cultural relations
- Wilhelm Holtz (1836–1913), German physicist, inventor of the Holtz machine
- Zane Holtz (born 1987), Canadian actor and model

== Fictional ==
- Daniel Holtz, a fictional character on the TV series Angel

== See also ==
- Holz
