= Holz =

Holz [holts] is a German surname meaning wood or timber. Notable people with the surname include:

- Arno Holz (1863–1929), German poet and dramatist
- Betty W. Holz (1919–2005), American mathematician
- George Holz, American photographer
- Ida Holz (born 1935), Uruguayan engineer and researcher
- Joshua Holz, creator of the 2016 Damn Daniel internet meme
- Justa Holz-Mänttäri, translation scholar
- Karl Holz (executive) (born 1952), chairman and CEO of Euro Disney SCA
- Karl Holz (Gauleiter) (1895–1945), German Nazi NSDAP Gauleiter of Franconia and SA Gruppenführer
- Karl Holz (violinist) (1798–1858), Austrian violinist and friend of Beethoven
- Paul Holz (1952–2017), German football player
- Richard E. Holz (1914–1986), American brass band composer

== Other uses ==
- Short for Holzblasinstrumente, see woodwinds

== See also ==
- Holt (disambiguation)
- Holtz
- Holzer
