= Credicorp Bank Tower =

Skyscraper in Costa del Este, Panama City

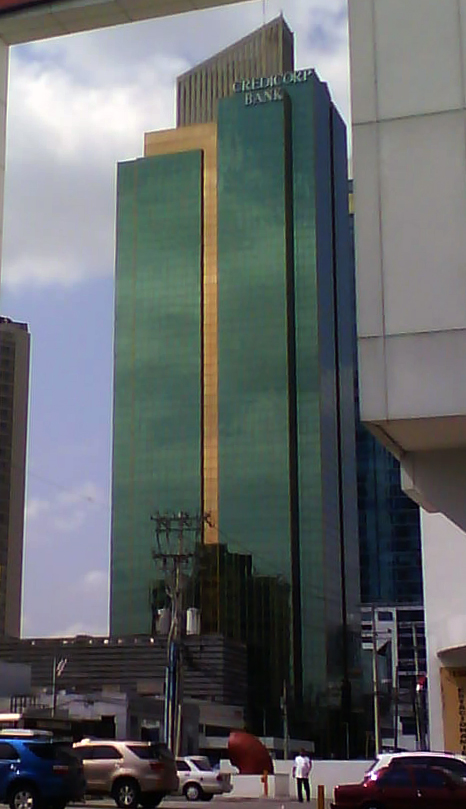
- Interactive map of the Credicorp Bank Tower area

General information
- Status: Completed
- Type: Office
- Location: Panama City, Panama, XFMM+RP9, Calle 50, Bella Vista, Panamá
- Coordinates: 8.98493°N 79.51563°W
- Completed: 1997
- Cost: $ 28,000,000
- Owner: Credicorp

Height
- Roof: 146 m (479 ft)

Technical details
- Structural system: Concrete
- Floor count: 42
- Floor area: 30,000 m^{2} (323,000 sq ft) (office)

Design and construction
- Architect: Richard Holzer

The Credicorp Bank Tower, also known as the PH Plaza Credicorp, is an office skyscraper in the Bella Vista district of Panama City, Panama. Completed in 1997, the tower stands at 146 m (479 ft) tall with 42 floors and is the 51st tallest building in Panama City. It also serves as the headquarters of the Panamanian filiale of the Credicorp Bank.

== Architecture ==
The building was designed by Panamanian architect Richard Holzer and is located in the Bella Vista district of Panama City. It was the first building in the country to have a fully glass-glazed facade, which is entirely made by green and gold coloured insulated glass panels. 31 of the 46 levels of the building feature a total of 30,000 m^{2} (323,000 sq ft) of usable areas for offices. At the first floors, the building provides restaurants, copy centers and other complementary services for tenants.

== See also ==
- List of tallest buildings in Panama City
