= Schevenhütte Quarry =

Abandoned quarry in Germany

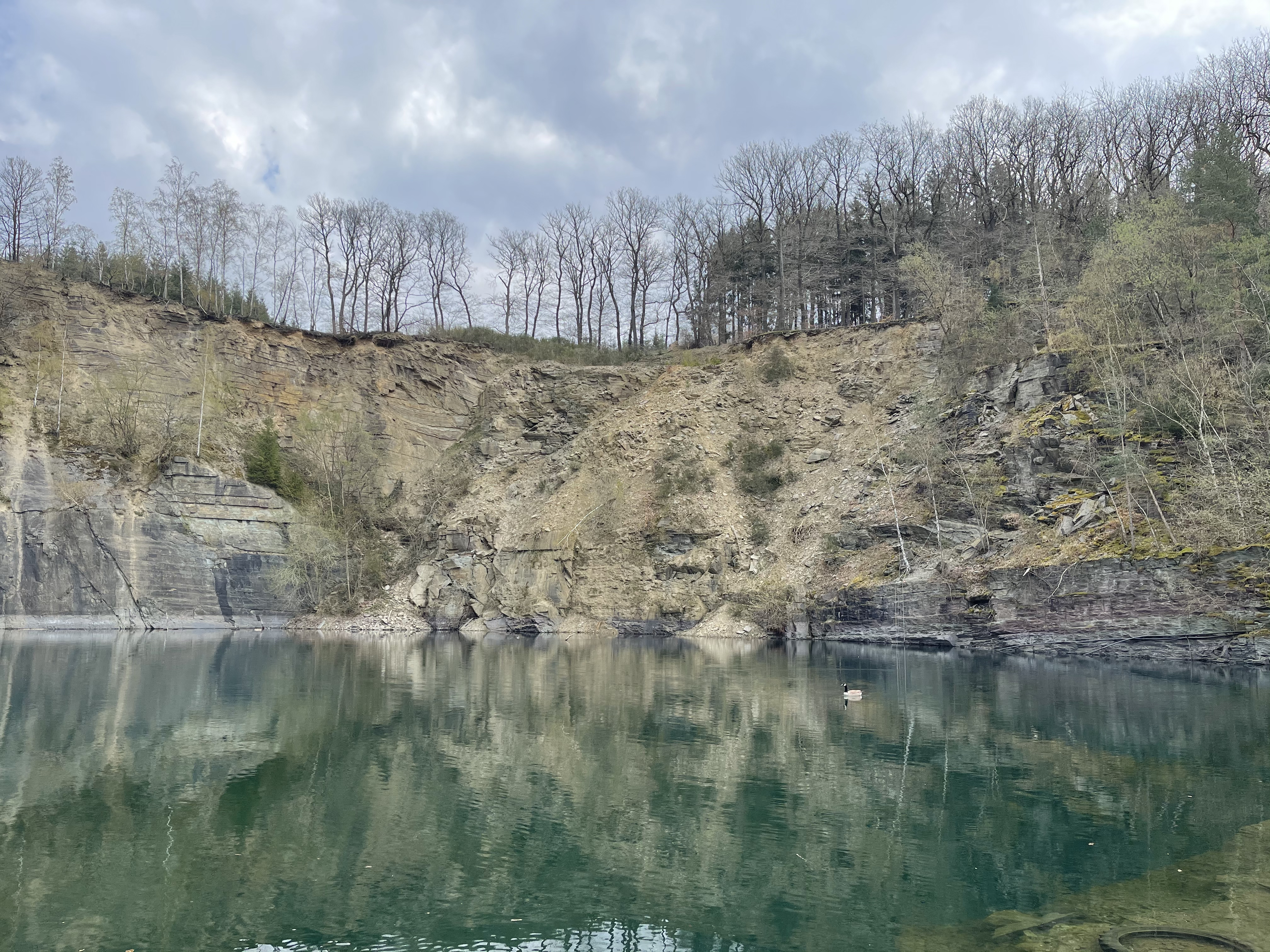
The quarry in April 2021

The Schevenhütte quarry is a former slate quarry in Stolberg-Schevenhütte. Unique Schevenhütte natural stone was quarried here presumably from the Middle Ages until 2008. In the 20th century until it was closed down, the quarry was called "Kaspar Müller I Quarry". It is located on the northern edge of the Eifel at the southern end of Schevenhütte. Geologically, it is part of the outermost foothills of the Venn saddle, where very old rocks from the latest Ordovician period are exposed. These rocks are the oldest in North Rhine-Westphalia. As a special feature, the so-called "Schevenhütter Schichten" (Schevenhütte strata) dip very straight in the quarry area and were thus worth mining. "Schevenhütter Naturstein" was quarried mainly in two varieties, a greenish and a red variety. Basically, the stone from the middle and upper Wehebach layers was roughly processed and sold on site. The "Schevenhütter Schiefer" (Schevenhütte Slate) was used in a variety of ways throughout the region, including as ornamental and rough building material, but also as walking slabs and as gravestones.

After the closure in 2008, slates still in stock were sold until the middle of 2012. After this time, the site was left to its own resources. The site was neither renaturalised nor restored nor was the slope stabilised. With the end of the swamping in the quarry basin, an endorheic small lake developed over time and the open quarry slope in the east suffers greatly from the lack of supporting rock, which repeatedly causes rock slides, landslides and mass movements.

Today, the quarry is a registered soil heritage site of the Kupferstadt Stolberg because of its outstanding role as a teaching and research object. The site is owned by Laufenburg GmbH and may not be entered due to the acute danger to life caused by the rock slides. The site is fenced off.

== Geological classification ==
Schevenhütte is located in the border area of the Ardennes and the northern Eifel in the valley of the Wehebach, with the Wehebach, as part of the Inde catchment area, draining into the Indemulde to the north. The most prominent part of the Ardennes is the Ardennes anticlinorium with the Rocroi and Stavelot-Venn large saddles. Schevenhütte is located exactly at the north-eastern end of the latter Venn saddle. In the Stavelot-Venn Grand Saddle, there are old rocks. The oldest layers are the Deville layers of the Lower Cambrian, followed by Revin layers of the Middle and Upper Cambrian and then by "Salm" rocks from the lowest Ordovician.

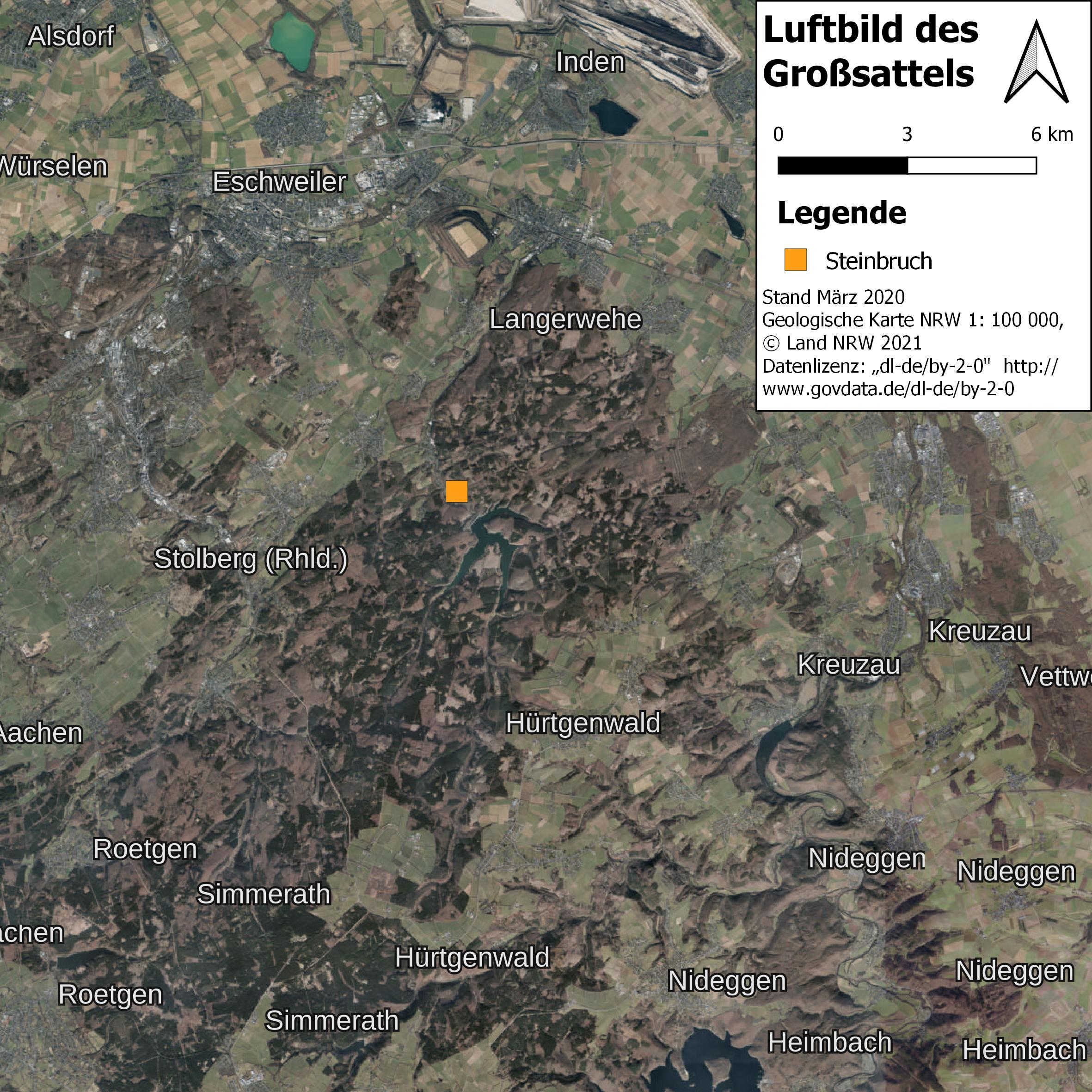
aerial Photosgraphy of the wider area

The quarried shales come from "Salm 2" (Sm2), today's Middle and Upper Wehebach strata. This makes the former quarry the site with the oldest exposed rock strata in NRW today. The age is 490 million years, whereby the determination can be made relatively accurately by the fossil of the graptolite species "Dictyonema flabelliforme".

Within the strata of SM2, the quarried siltstone is found in two different predominant forms, which differ mainly in their sandstone content. The greener variety is also called banded shale and is dominated by fine sand- and silt-streaked mudstones, in some of which sandstone beds can be found. Next to it is a redder, more clayey variant without sandstones. The clayey variant increases towards the top and thus the red colouring also becomes stronger. These layers of the Upper Salm occur once more to the south at the headwaters of the Thönbach (a tributary of the Wehebachtalsperre). Thus, the occurrence in this form is limited to the synclinories of the Wehe and the Thönbach. The red colouration of the rock is not completely clarified, although much points to a stronger haematite and manganese oxide content, as solution from the overlying colourful Gedinne layer is no longer considered likely today.

The strata were already deformed during the Kalendonian mountain building in the Silurian and then, clearly visible through tectonic structures, again during the Variscan mountain building in the Carboniferous. The tectonic deformations are particularly well visible along the scarp of the L25 in Schevenhütte, for about 300 m north of the quarry. This rock formation is also a registered archaeological monument. There are mainly north-vergent folds and thrusts dipping to the south. The fold axes run W-E, the slate rock of the Wehebach strata dips S there. The quarry, which is only about 30 metres higher, is clearly less folded. The strata of siltstone and banded schist found here show weak bending of their bedding planes in contrast to the shale-sandstone sequences along the road.

Along the eastern slope of the Wehetal, the bedrock strikes out regularly. Due to the location, the soil formation is not very strong and the cover is thin. Above the edge of the quarry, the soil thickness is at most 30 cm.

== Historical context ==
=== Historical origins of the area ===
The Wehe area was settled and mined at the latest in Roman times, probably even earlier. The Wenau monastery was founded as early as 1122. The name shows that the Wehe was already in use at that time. Iron was probably mined in the area of the Rote and Weiße Wehe to the south of Schevenhütte as early as pre-Roman times, but certainly in Roman times. In addition, an old Roman road coming from Kornelimünster ran through Schevenhütte, up through the Wehe valley to the Rennweg in the direction of Düren, which still exists today. The end of the Roman period also marked the end of iron processing for the time being. It was rekindled by the copper masters, who settled in rows along the Wehe. During this period, charcoal burning was also very strong and the slopes of the Wehe valley were almost completely cleared. In Schevenhütte the conditions were very good due to the water power of the Wehe stream, the forests of the Eifel and the ore and stone deposits. Industry did not come to a standstill until the middle of the 19th century.

=== History of the site ===
On the Tranchot Map, the map of the Rhineland drawn by the French around 1805, a quarry operation can already be seen at the present location. The inscription on the map is definitely wrong, as the Wittberg lies much further north, but the other localities are correct. The quarry is not to be seen on the Prussian original map, but this is also somewhat less informative in terms of quality. On the new Prussian map and the 1936-1945 TK25 the quarry is clearly visible.

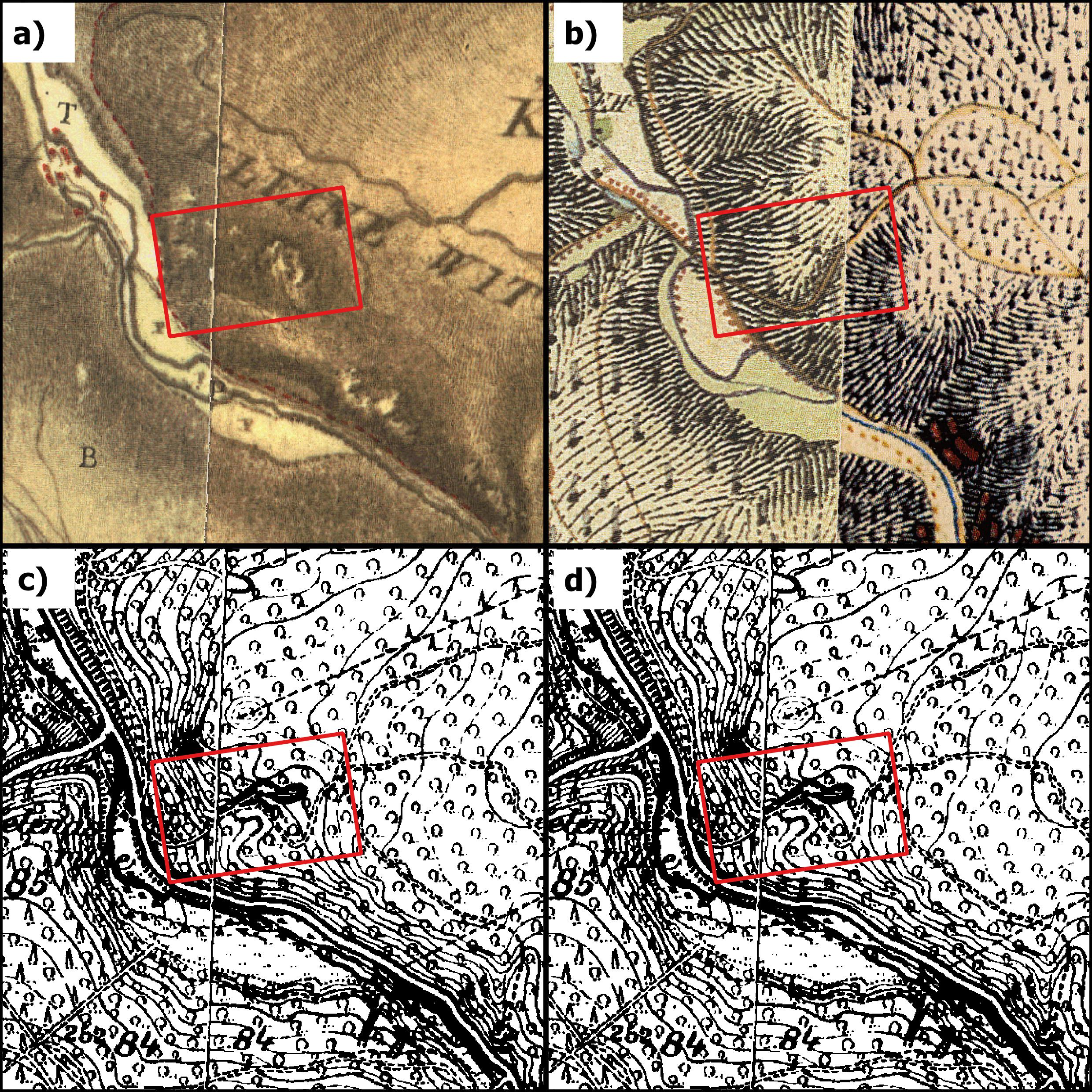
Several different time periods displayed. On most of them the quarry is visible. All Scales are 1:10,000

The leasing and use of the quarry during the period of more than 200 years is not completely clear.

It is certain that the quarry was used to procure building materials for the forester's lodge (today Nideggenerstraße 99) near Helenasruh, which was built in 1852. Until the end of the 19th century, the quarry consisted of two smaller quarries. With the construction of the parish church in Schevenhütte around 1890, so much material was quarried that the separating rock bar disappeared and the site could be operated as a single quarry. There is evidence from 1894 of the extraction of large stone slabs in the operation of a local stonemason by the parish priest of Schevenhütte; around the turn of the century a new tenant operated the quarry with two men-servants and two horses each. There is evidence that the quarried slabs were delivered as far away as Aachen Rothe Erde. In 1911, the Stolberg entrepreneur Hans Prym bought the surrounding forest and with it the property of the quarry. Until the First World War, slabs for pavements and the like continued to be exported to the surrounding area of Aachen. After the war, the quarry was dormant until about 1935, when Prym found a new tenant. He employed up to 15 workers. The overburden from the quarry was used by pioneers as a substructure for the road to Düren as part of the construction of the Westwall. Due to a lack of work, quarrying came to a standstill again around 1940.

The course and ownership of the quarry after the Second World War are also unclear. Kaspar Müller presumably took over the quarry operations around the 1950s. From then on, the operation also bore the name "Kaspar Müller I Quarry". At the beginning of the 1980s, he finally bought the quarry site from Laufenburg GmbH. In the 1960s, up to 60 employees were employed and 600-900 t of material were quarried per month; in the 1950s, there were still only about 30 employees and 400-450 t. Quarrying became more and more motorised and the demands on the products also changed several times over the years (see below), but on 30 June 2008 active operations ended at the Kaspar Müller I quarry. The stockpile of stone slabs continued until August 2011. With the cessation of work, the mucking measures in the quarry basin also ended. the site was not left in an orderly manner. The buildings were left unchanged, and the site was neither renaturalised nor secured against rockfalls.

=== Efforts for other quarry operations ===
In the 1950s, a new quarry site, Steinbruch Kaspar Müller II, was developed in order to gain greater independence from the lease of the parent quarry. Due to poor rock properties, the quarry never became economically viable and mining ceased again a few years later. Due to the Wehebachtalsperre, the area at the former confluence of the Rote and Weiße Wehe is now in the flood zone.

Another attempt at expansion occurred around the same time near the present-day water treatment of the Wehebachtalsperre in the form of the Schwontzen quarry. Here, too, both the uneconomical nature and the insufficient rock quality led to its swift abandonment.

== Operation of the quarry ==
=== Quarried rocks ===
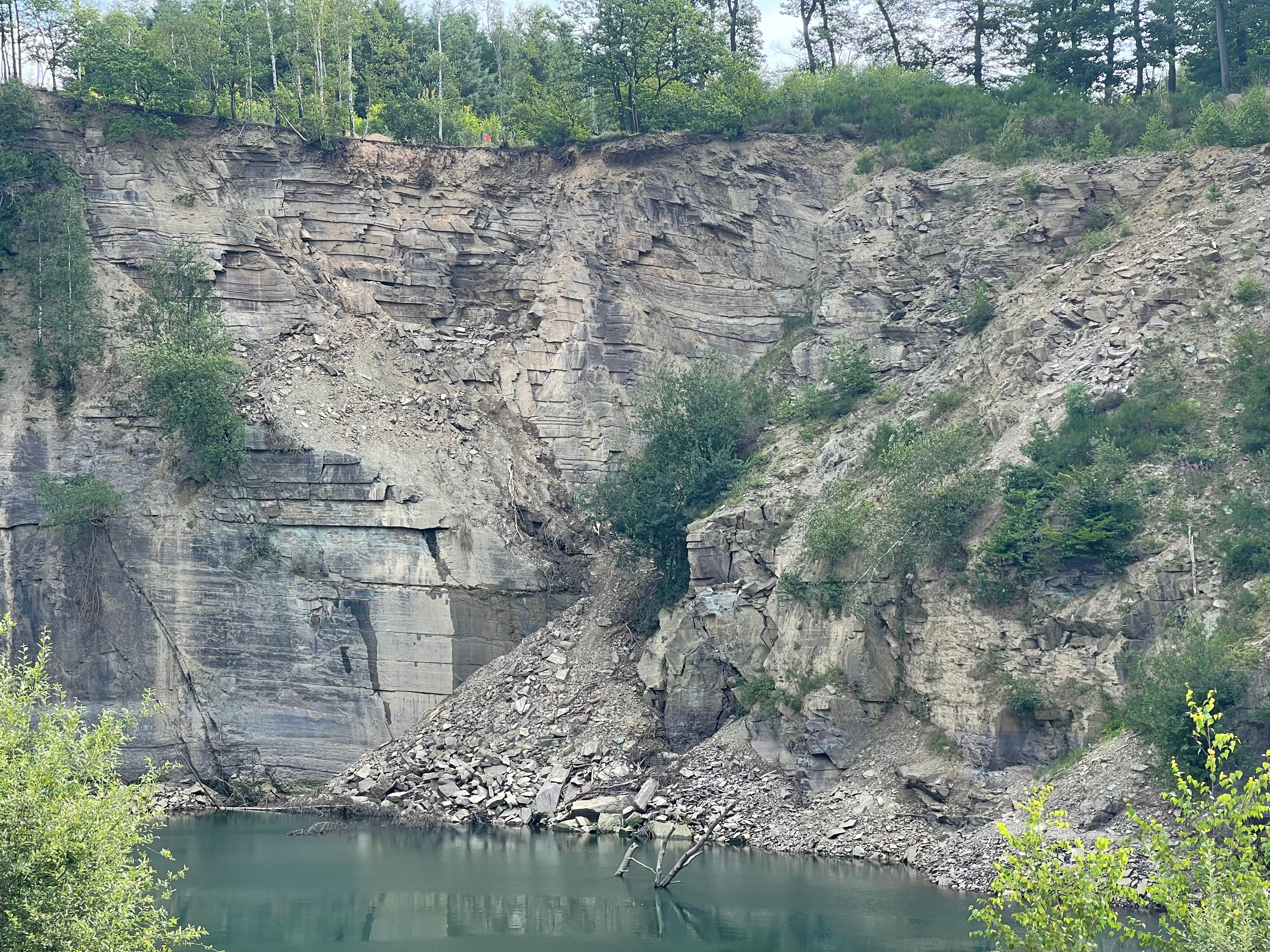
Edge of Mining just before the blasting in 2021

Primarily two varieties of ornamental rock were mined and processed. Even if the lithological description and naming is not quite clean, the commonly used names are given. The grey-green fibrous siltstone is popularly called "Tonschiefer" (clay shale); the red-purple one is called Bänderschiefer (banded shale).

The predominant variety of exposed siltstone is the grey-green to bluish clay-banded siltstone. As described, these rocks are among the oldest in North Rhine-Westphalia and were formerly placed in the Salm 2, although they are more likely to be placed in the lower Salm due to a find of Dictyonema flabelliforme. In various literature these layers are also described as Wehebach layers. The layers in the quarry are relatively little folded, which made quarrying economical.

In the prominent east wall, the clay shales and the banded shales are recognisable with occasional benched sandstones. These sandstone beds can be classified as turbidites, as they partly carry ripple bedding and convolute bedding structures. They have a high carbonate content, which produces the dark brown discolouration during weathering.

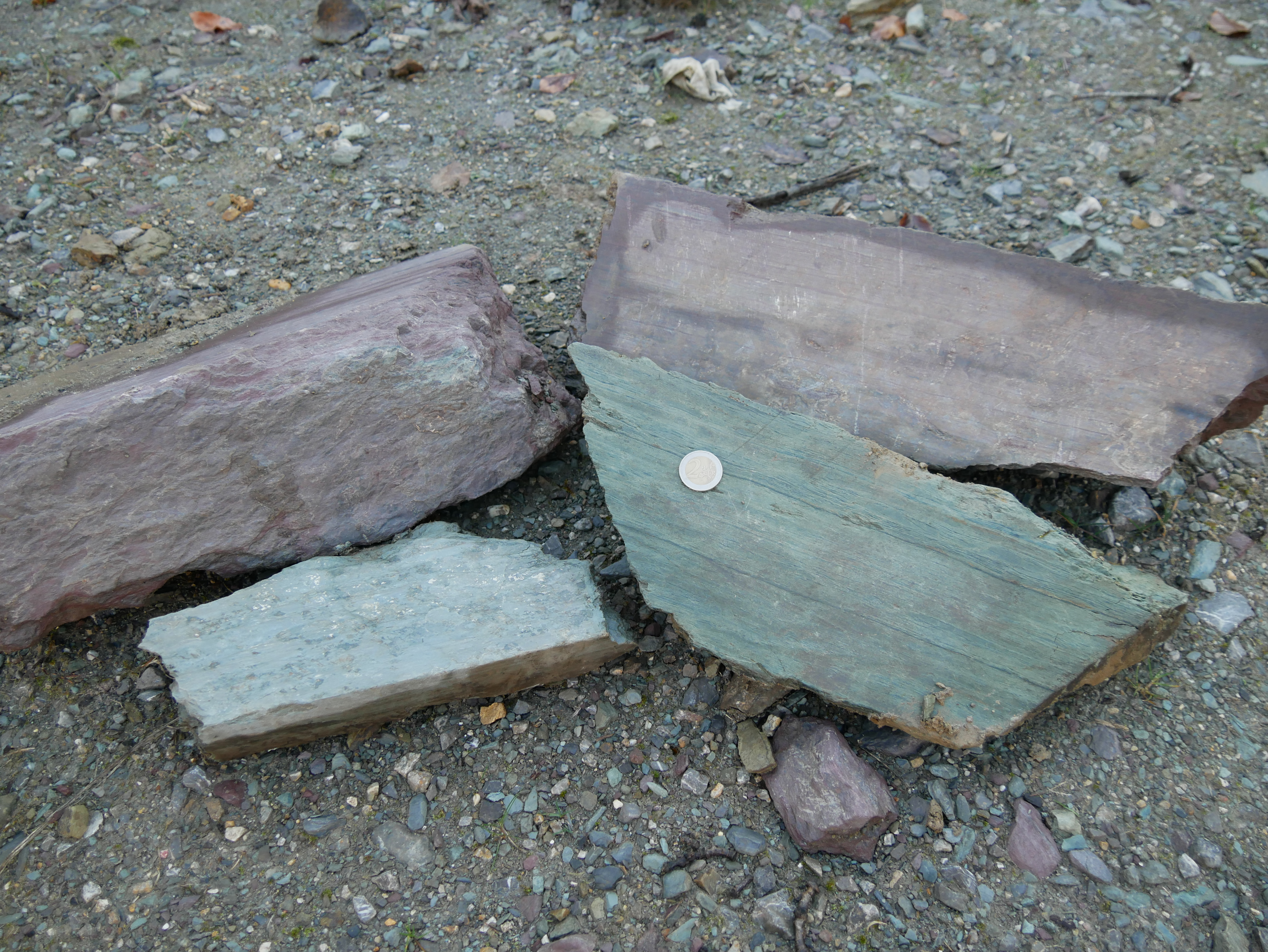

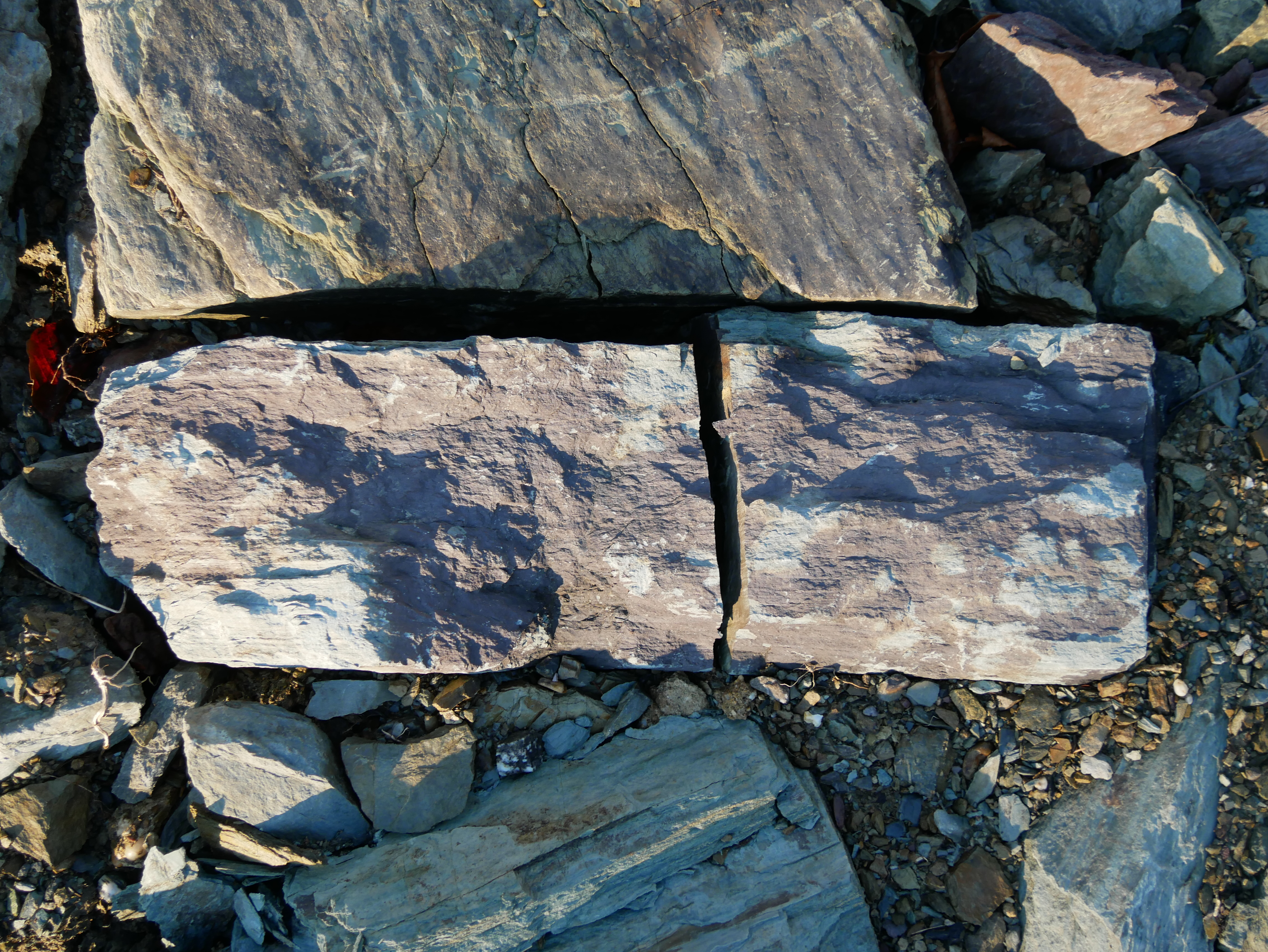

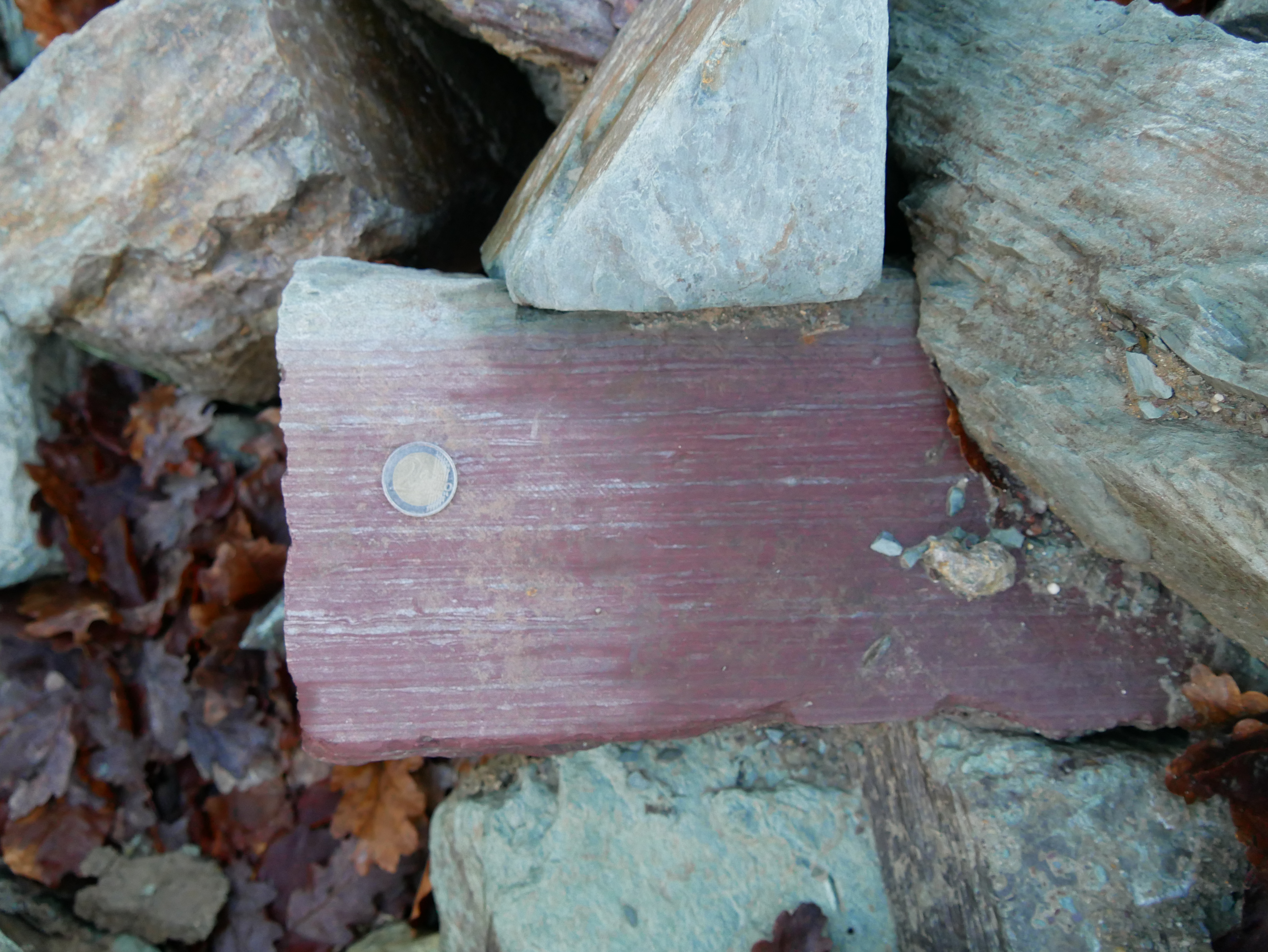

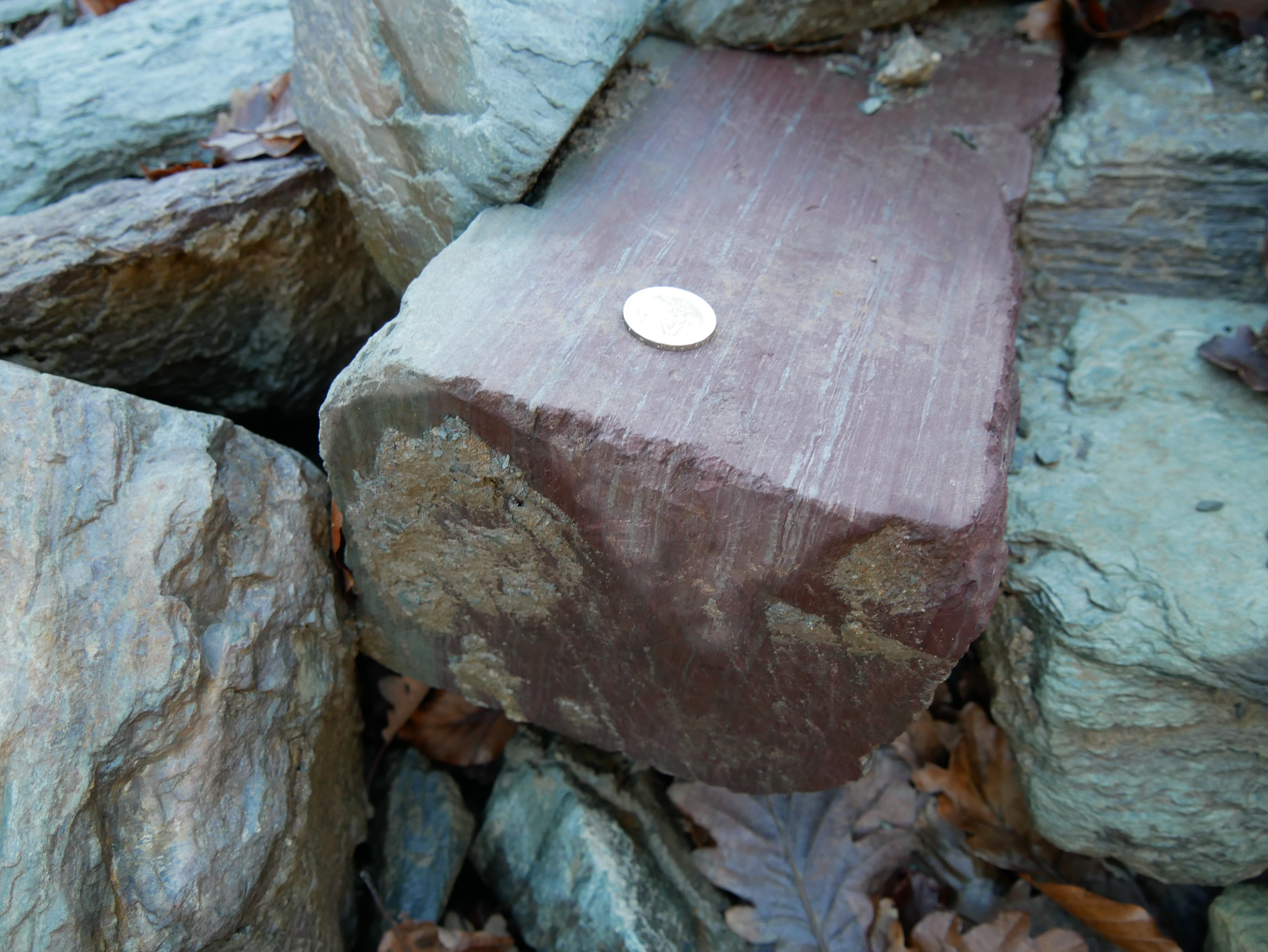

=== Clay slate ===
The Tonschiefer from the lower Salm (Wehebach layers) is a clay-banded siltstone with a grey-greenish colour. (Walter 2010) The layers of the clay shale are mostly deeper than the banded shale, are much better sorted and partly carry sandstone beds in the rock.

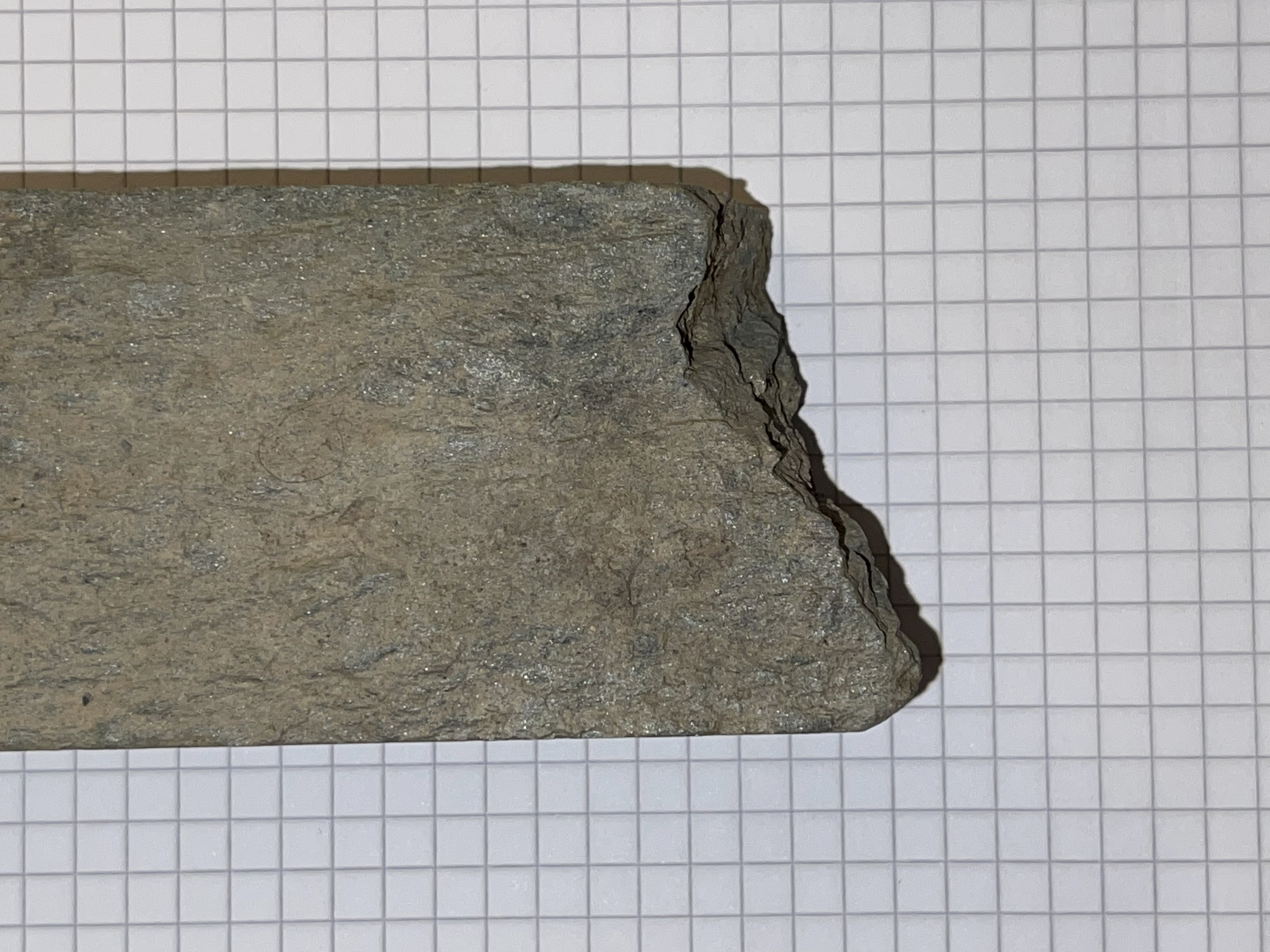

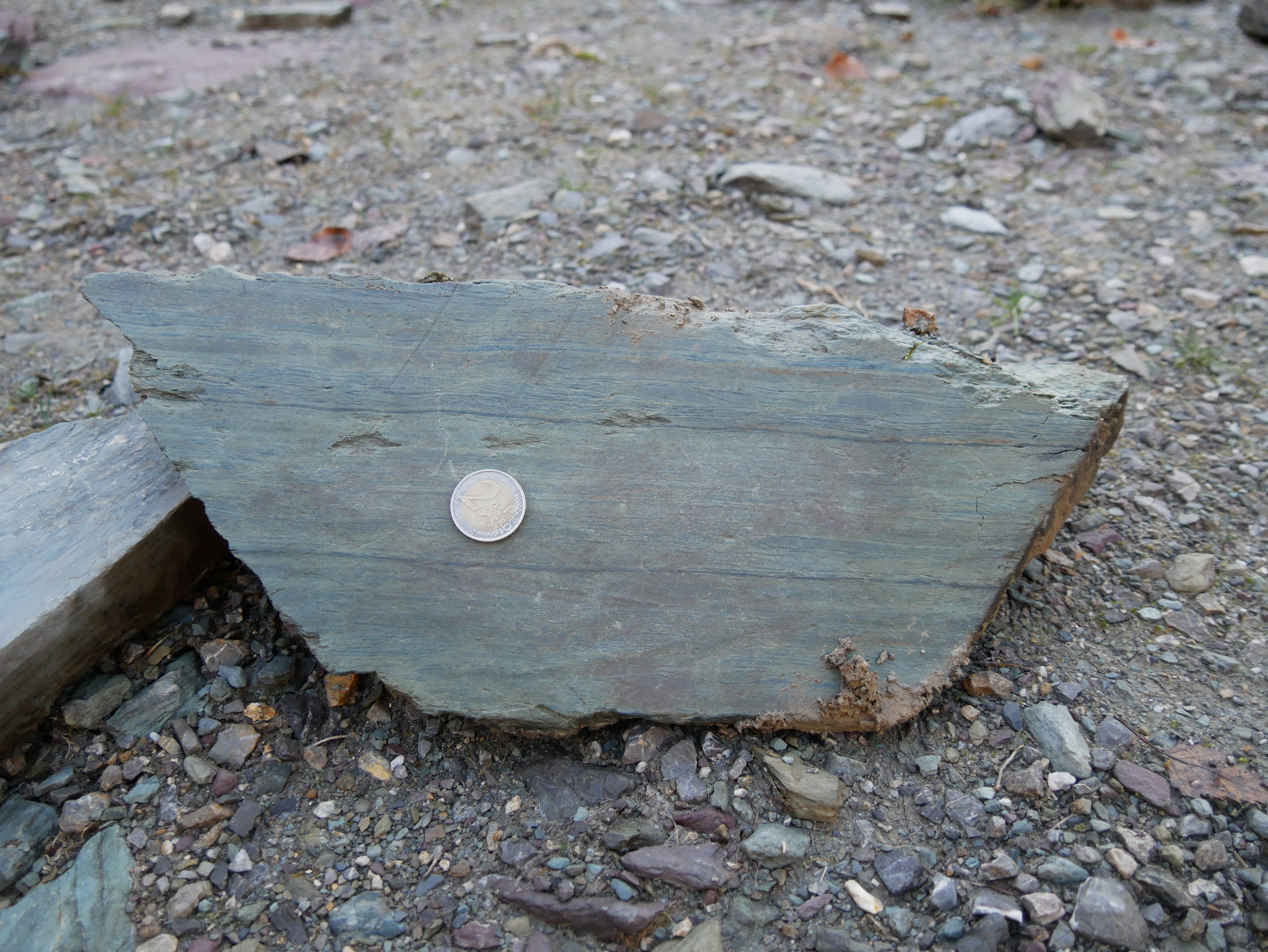

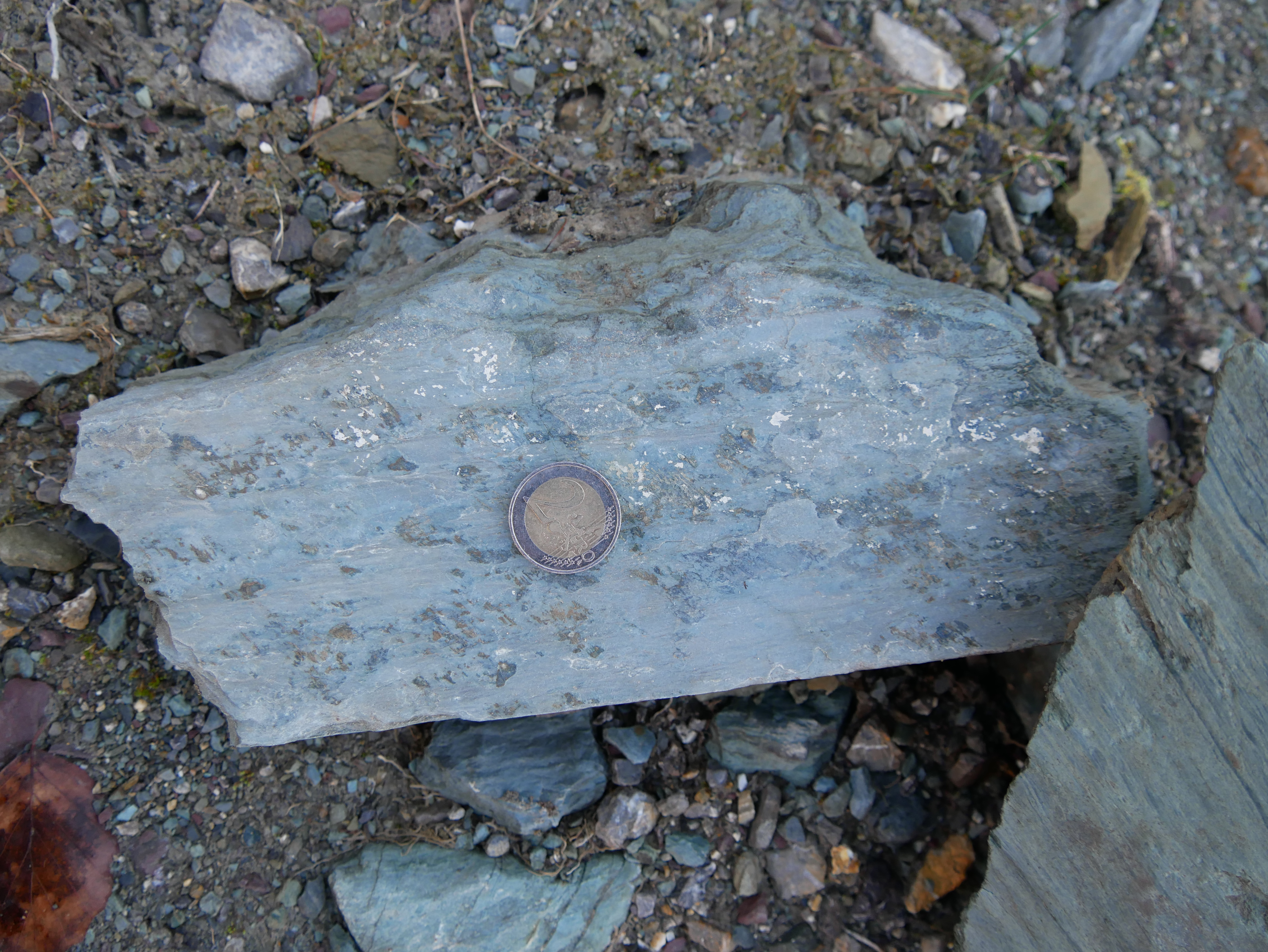

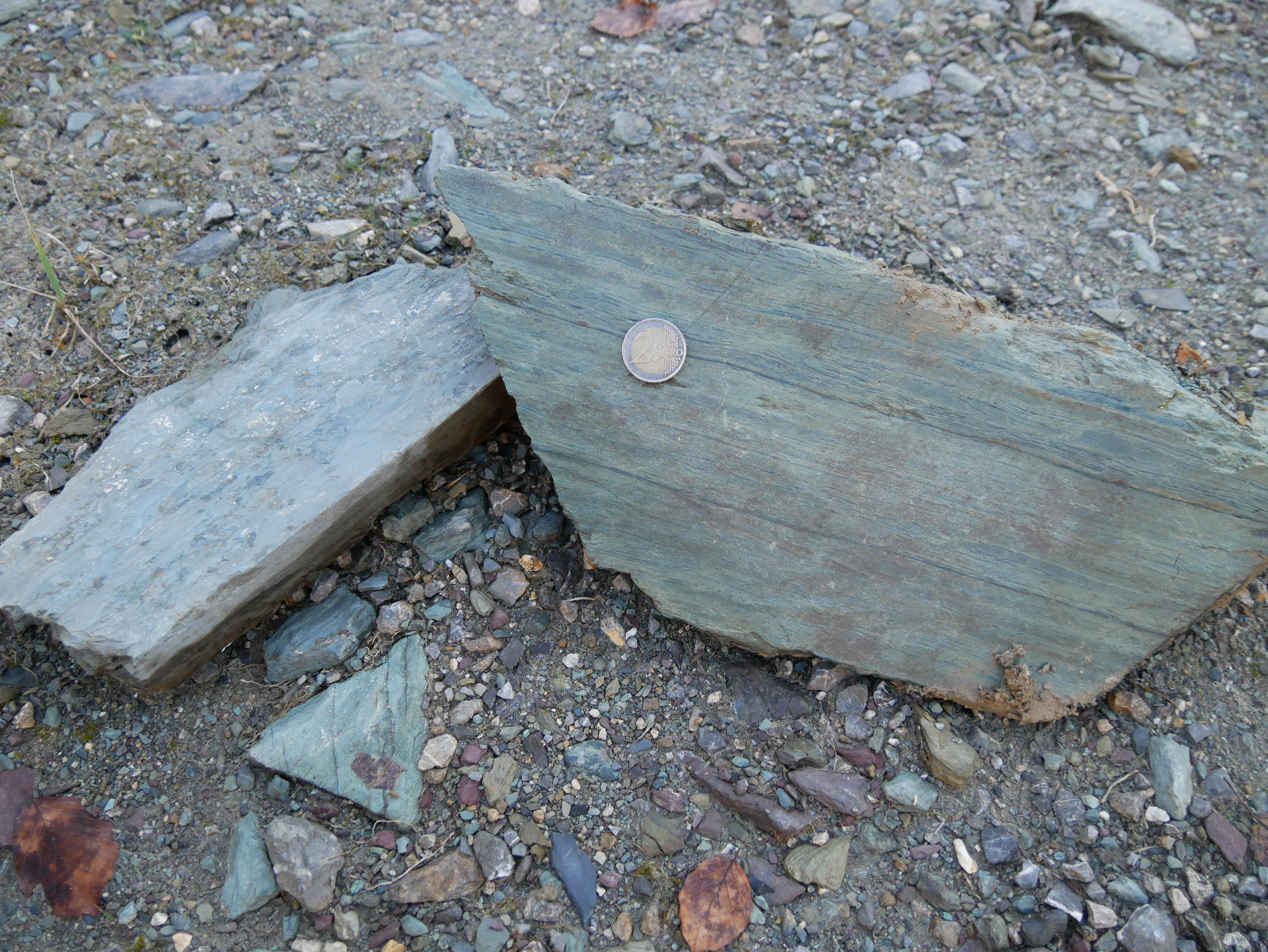

=== Banded shale ===
The reddish-purple, more clayey Bänderschiefer without sandy parts tends to be exposed in the upper layers. The red colour is due to an increased manganese oxide and haematite content, which in turn were caused by submarine volcanic ejections and could sediment particularly well at this location. Individual layers of fine sand wedge out of the banded shales, creating a characteristic flashlayer. This can be seen as graded fine stratification on the surfaces of the rocks (see pictures). A very dense bioturbation prevails. Sedimentation of the ribbon shale occurred on a shallow marine delta platform.

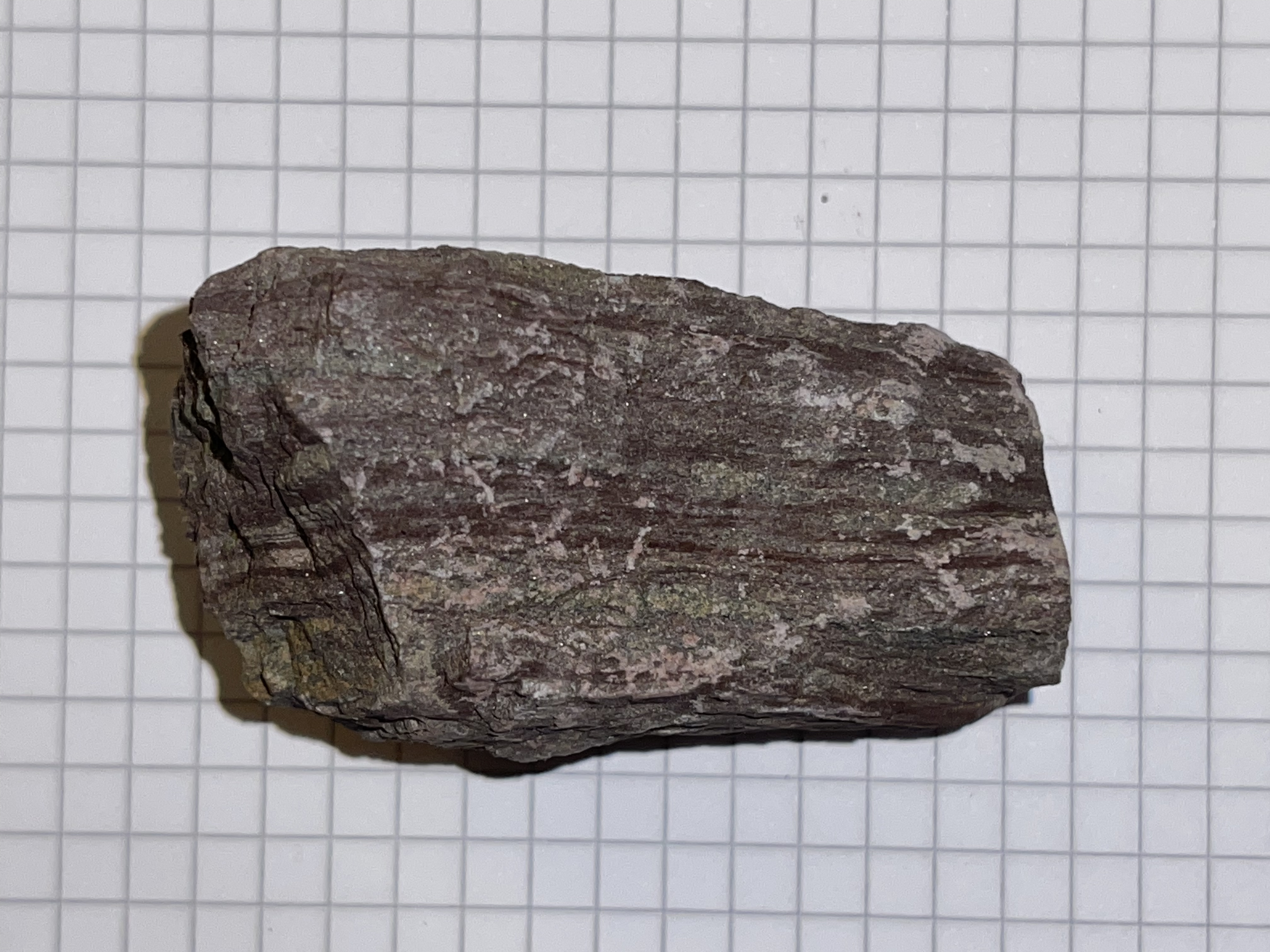

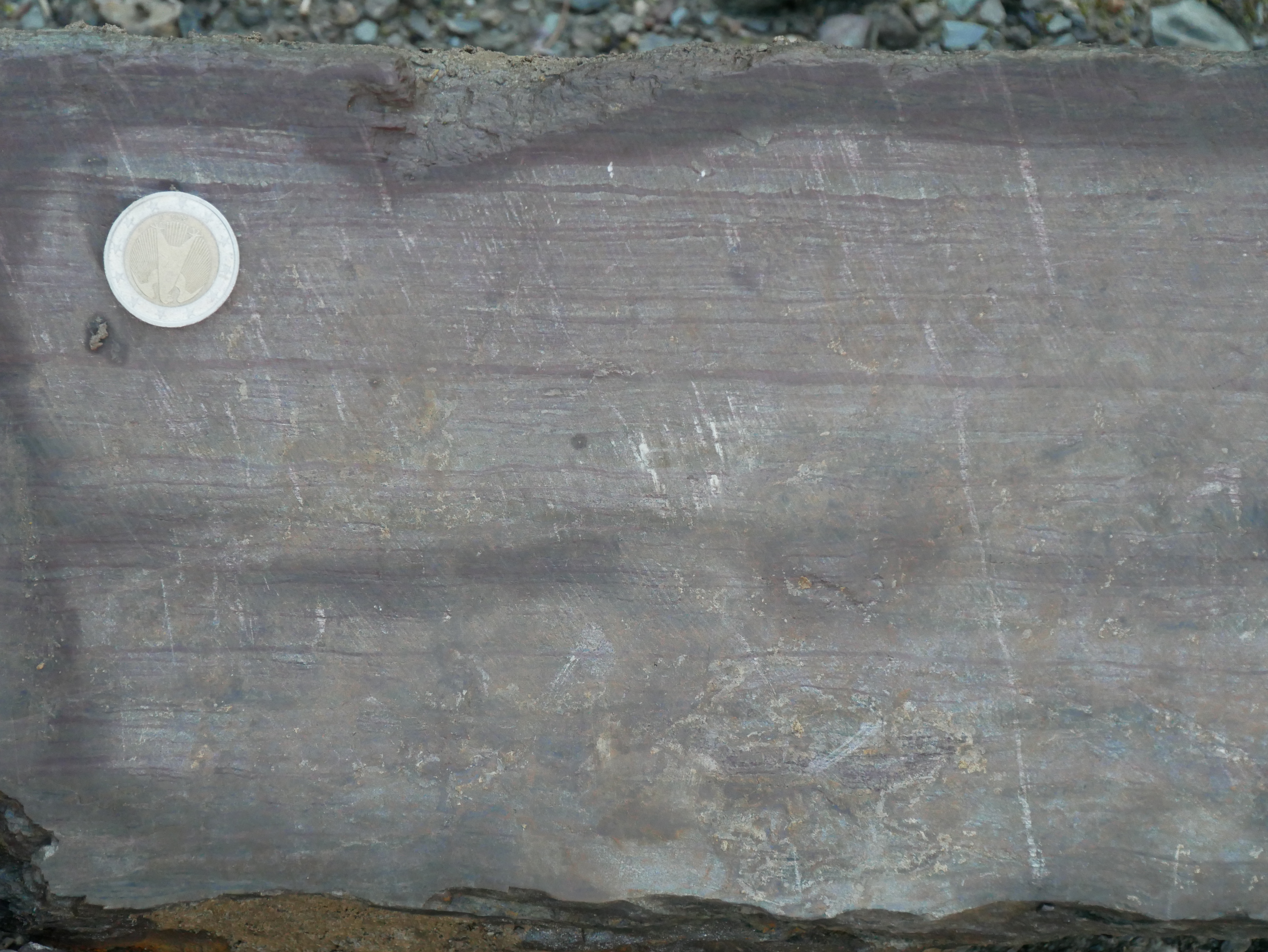

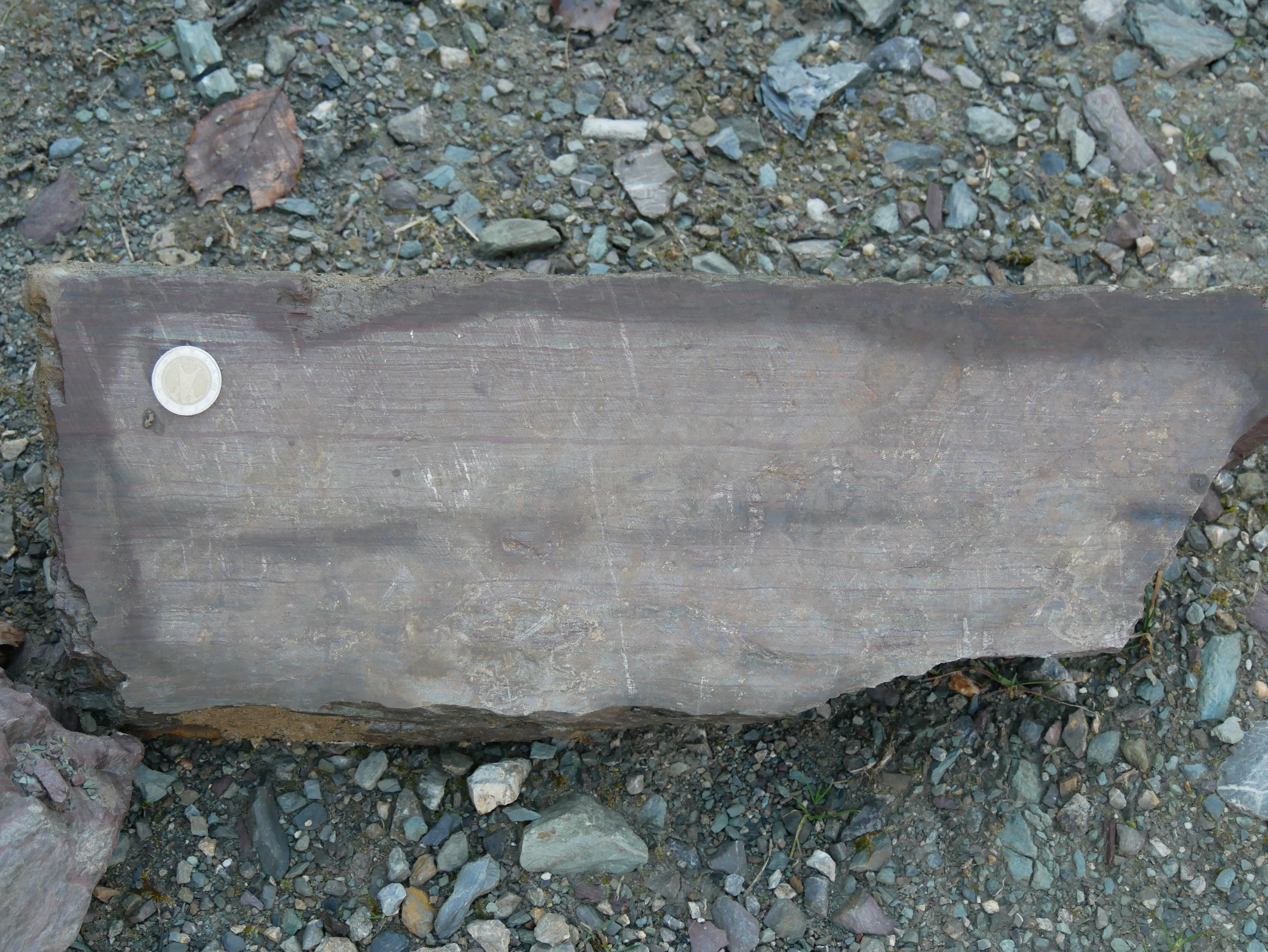

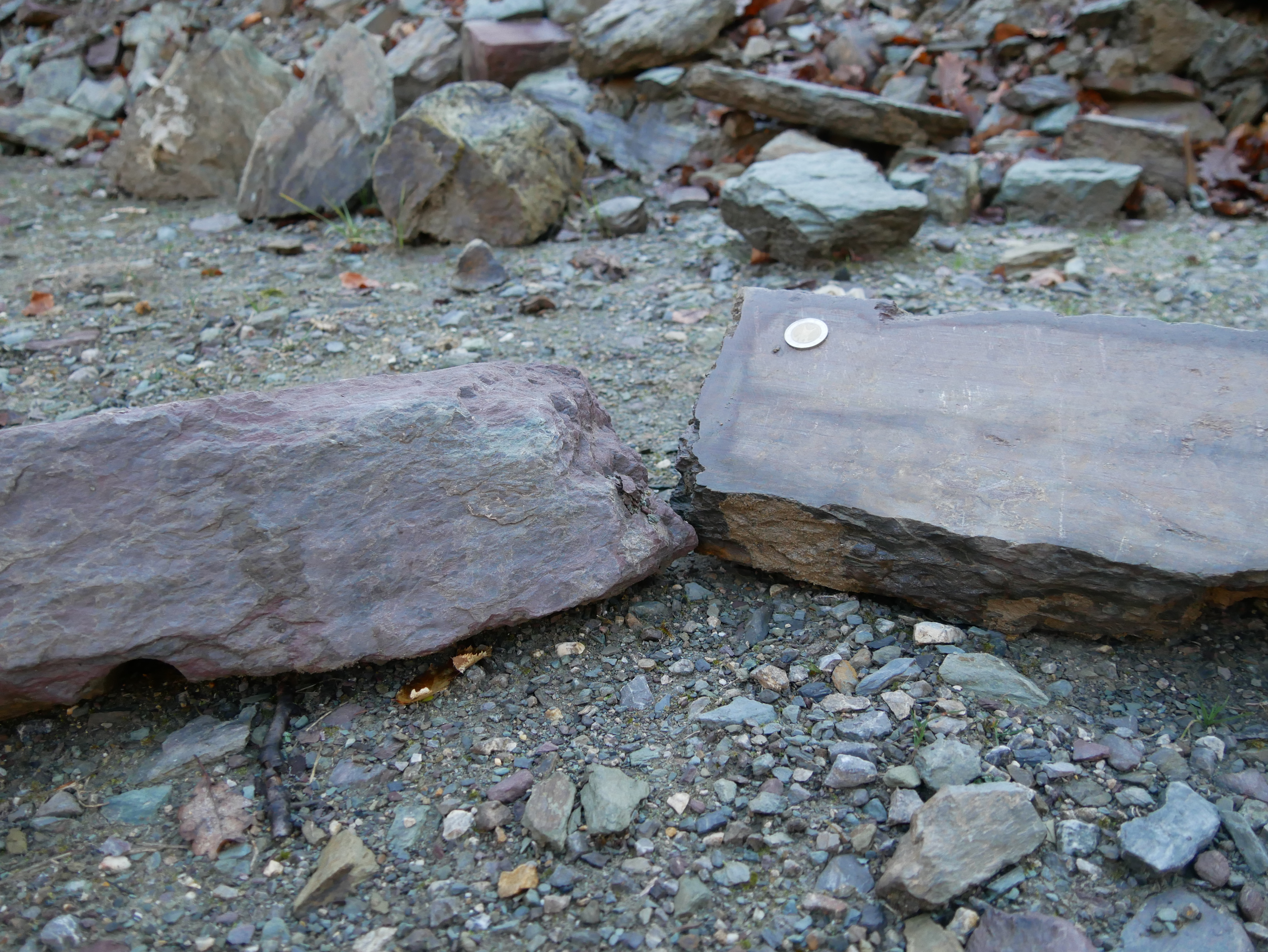

== Mining methods ==
Mining was mainly done along the north–south axis of the fault. Starting on the south side, the mining area extends up to 120 m in diameter. Little is known about the mining methods used in earlier years, but the extent of mining should not have been much greater than that of the surrounding smaller hews. It was only with the industrial use of the rock from the 1950s onwards that today's larger mining area developed. As a result, the eastern side, which is so prominent today, was opened up with the individual layers. Mining began on the south side and was carried out using the bench method at a depth of about 100 m at ground level and only about 47 m at the lower level. On the north side and to a certain extent also on the west side, the individual drifts are still recognizable. Due to the almost horizontal bedding of the strata, large blocks could be extracted from the rock again and again. Again and again, boreholes up to 8 m deep were driven and by shooting, the block was loosened from the bond. The explosions were clearly felt in the village.

== Processing and use ==
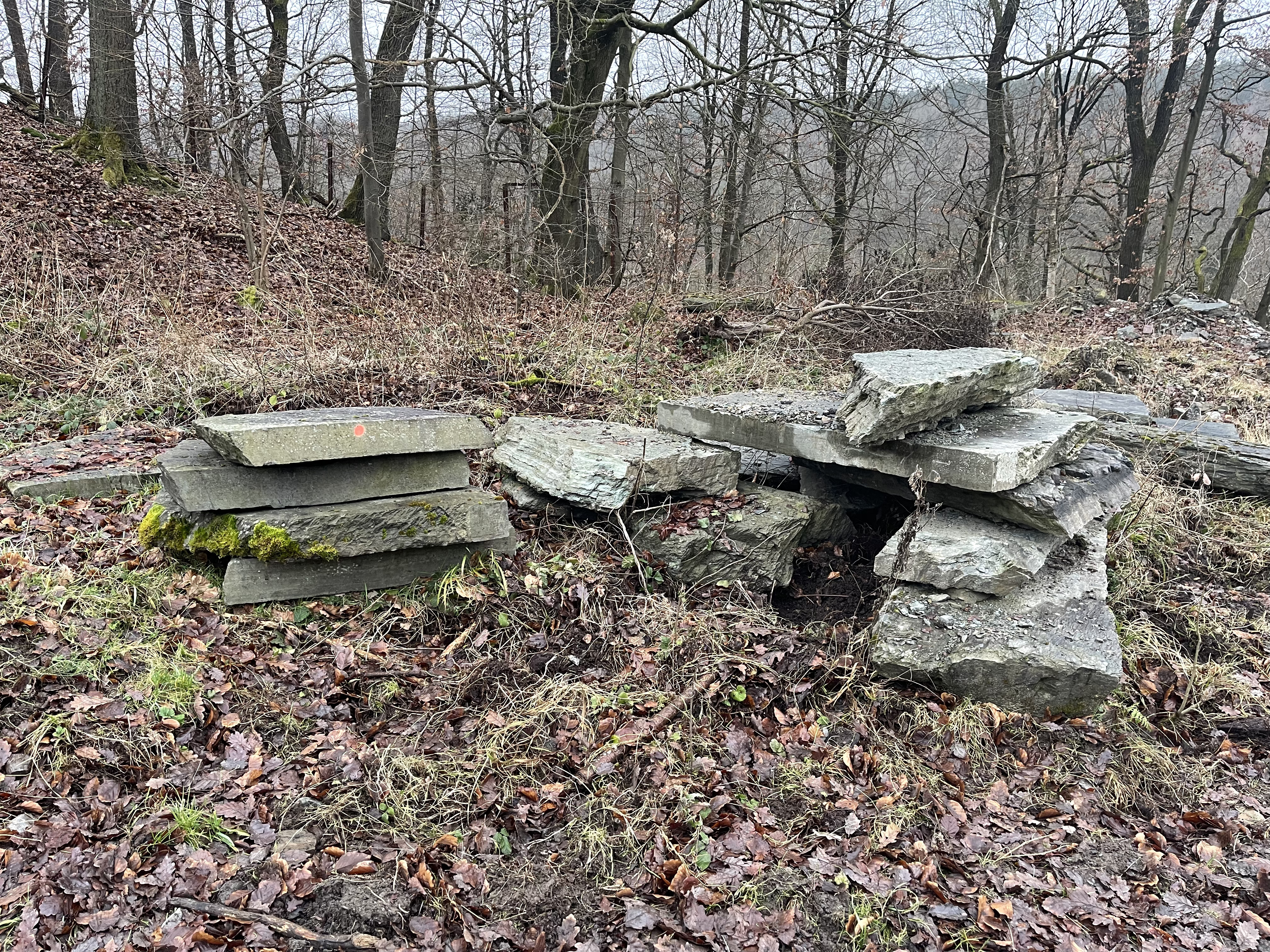
processed slateplates

Due to their good splitting properties, the broken blocks were mostly used as pavement slabs or low precision cut construction methods such as dry stone walls. The nearby Laufenburg contains small portions of the broken material in its masonry from 1217. Even in the Middle Ages, therefore, the slabs were quarried using simple tools such as pickaxes and crowbars, and prepared for use in a rudimentary way with chisels, fistfuls and lumps. Towards the end of the 19th century, the stone in particular was worked somewhat finer and shaped into elongated cuboids for buildings and used in irregular masonry. In the middle of the 20th century, large, mighty slabs were also processed as work stones on gables and the like. In later times, the natural stone was mainly used as clinker and was therefore sold treated with a stone saw with small thicknesses. From this time onwards, solid stones were often used as gravestones, but were not easy for stonemasons to work with due to the stone's properties.

== After the decommissioning ==
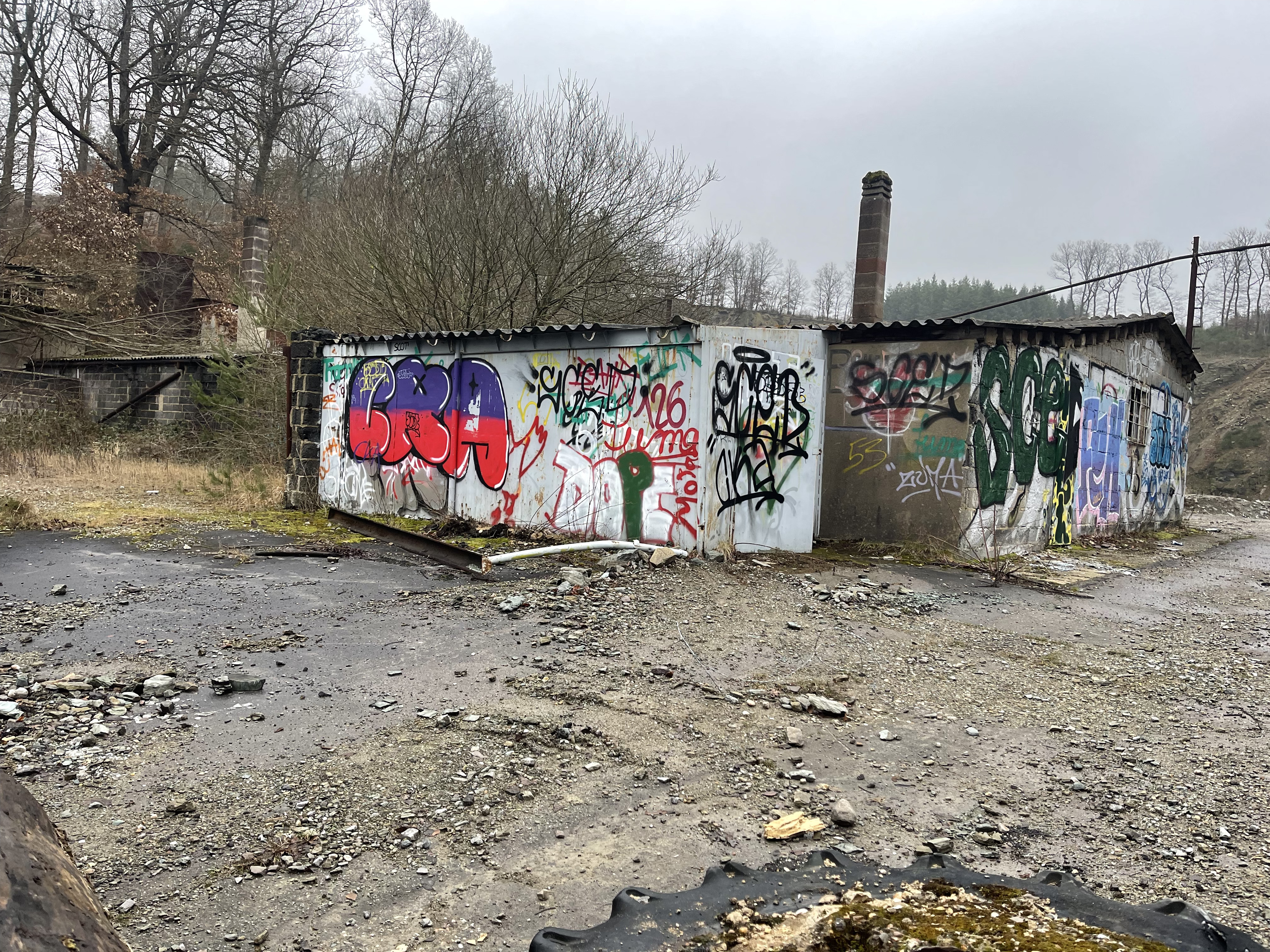
Signs of vandalism

After the final closure in 2012, the site was not properly decommissioned. The buildings remained standing and the demolition edges etc. were neither renaturalised nor secured. The area was frequently visited for a while, but is now completely fenced off and may not be entered.

After the site was abandoned, the pump in the south of the site was exposed and the excavation pond began to fill with groundwater, presumably from two stories, and rainwater. After a few years it had reached the height of the factory site and was threatening to run down the slope into the valley. This was successfully countered by pumping out and draining.

The buildings left behind quickly became the object of vandalism. Large parts of the site are now sprayed with graffiti and the tools were either looted or destroyed with great force. Much of the old equipment, laced with oil and other things, was thrown into the lake and so it was permanently damaged as a habitat. All access points to the site are now fenced off and may not be entered due to the acute danger to life.

=== Nature ===
Since the site was not properly decommissioned, the facilities are still there and the sealing of the ground was not removed. Nevertheless, the site became a habitat worth protecting in the period after the closure.

Ducks regularly swim and rest on the lake in the centre, and the lake is often used as a stopover during goose migration periods. The warmth and the dry rocks in combination with the lake provide a good habitat for grass snakes. At the transition between the lake and the factory site in the north-east, there is a wet, very shallow reed area due to the high water level, in which several toad species live.

In the first years after closure, the rocky outcrops were home to an eagle owl, which, however, can no longer be found there due to vandalism and constant disturbances.

=== Rock stability ===
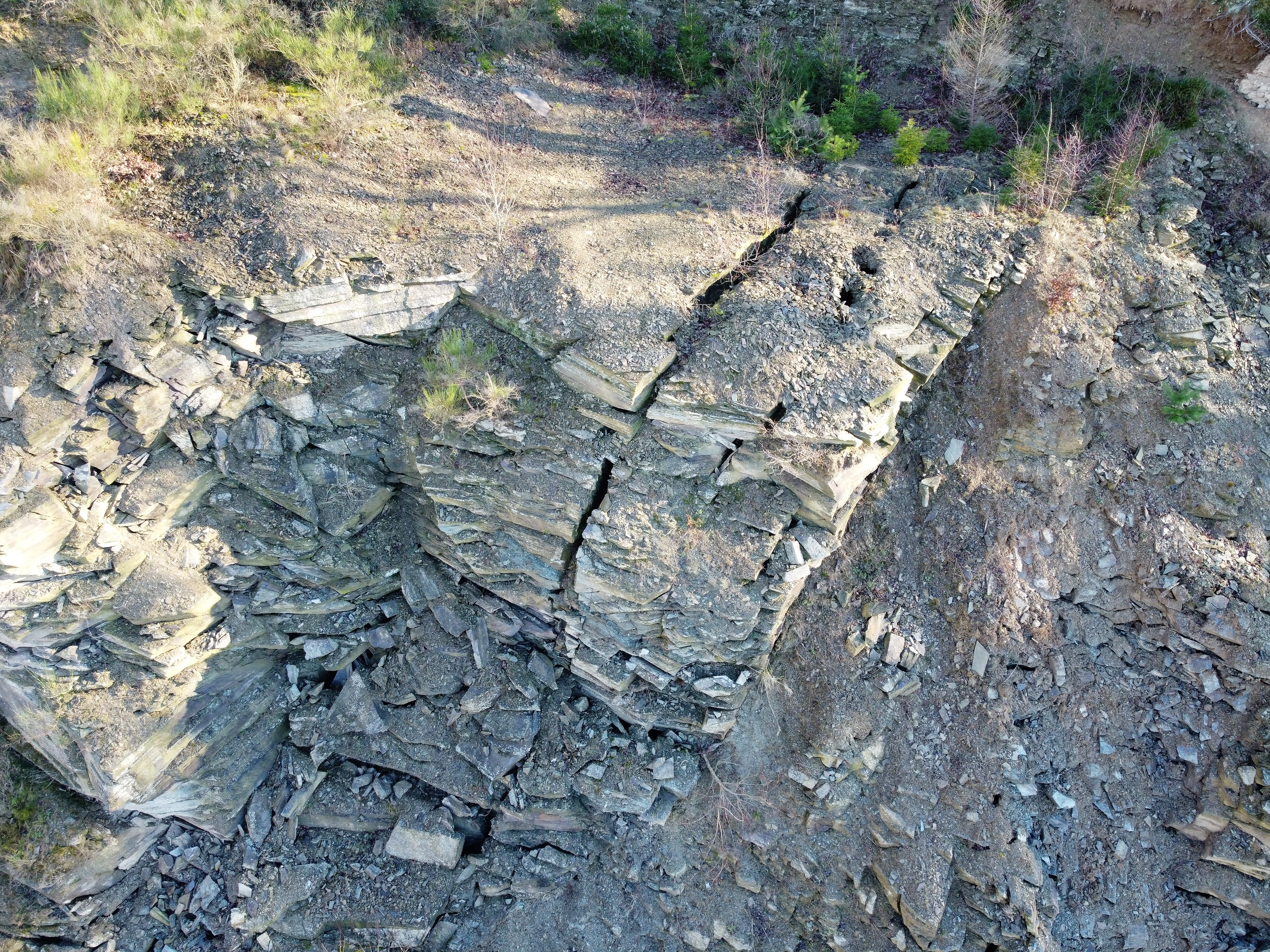

During mining, a pump ran permanently to pump out the escaping groundwater (presumably from two different groundwater levels) and to enable operation. Along the east wall, a steep wall was created that is now about 40 metres high, which opens up the different strata. During mining, the difference in height would have been about 50–55 metres, as the lake could not yet compensate for the difference. Due to the lack of supporting rocks, the rock units above the stone wall are tilting in sometimes very large break-off movements. The eastern wall can be divided into three areas due to anthropogenic interventions and natural conditions:

1. The boulder of sandstone, in the south of the quarrying area, adjacent to the east wall.
2. The east wall, which was partially blasted away in the summer of 2021
3. Remnant shale at the northern edge of the main wall, which was not blasted off and is now slipping away.

==== The NE break-off edge ====
The southern rock wedge between the southern and eastern break-off edge consists of strongly sandy mudstones and was therefore not worth quarrying. The edge was therefore not quarried and stands quite exposed.

==== Blasted middle area ====
The large east wall, the most prominent feature of the quarry, was in danger of collapsing soon after closure. Small rockfalls occurred several times and a cone of debris already formed at the foot of the steep face, protruding from the approximately 15-metre-deep lake in the quarry basin. Here, the most obvious tilting movements of the steep face could be seen, which formed a 5–6 m wide and 60 m long break-off area. The crack in the top of the rock was so strong that it was even clearly visible in the digital terrain model (DTM) with a resolution of 1 × 1 m. The height of the break-off area went down to the next stable layer of clay shale about 20 m from the ground level. In rainy periods, a groundwater table also emerges here and drains into the lake. Occasionally, the demolition wedge was still held in place by the vegetation, especially the roots of trees.

Even though the large gap had withstood the extreme stress of the great flood in July 2021, the rock edge was still blasted as a precaution. In preparation, the lake was pumped empty above ground and drained into the Wehebach. In addition, the terrain was torn up and a new fixed hose was laid. Furthermore, on the day of the blasting itself, an additional protective dam was heaped up against the feared flood wave.

The blasting was planned and carried out by the Cologne district government. The force of the explosion and the subsequent mass movement was felt throughout the village of Schevenhütte. Since the blast, many smaller stones have been crumbling into the lake and there have been several small landslides. Due to the lack of supporting rocks, parts from the north of the east wall are caving in and threatening to fall.

==== NW break-off edge ====
The largest rockfall could be controlled by the blasting, but as a result of the lack of supporting rock, smaller rock outcrops of clearly banded clay slate are now consecutively breaking off and forming new clear rock jumps. Here, too, large chunks break off, even if they are not as high as those on the east wall or on the sandstone wedge. The tilting is directed towards the south into the free area of the blasted-off area. Two blocks, each about 4 m long and 3 m wide, have already sunk several centimetres from the top of the rock and are completely surrounded by fissures several metres deep to the east and north. The area north of the two larger boulders is also involved in this tilting movement and is also in danger of collapsing.
