= Stolberg (Rhineland) =

Town in North Rhine-Westphalia, Germany

- Town
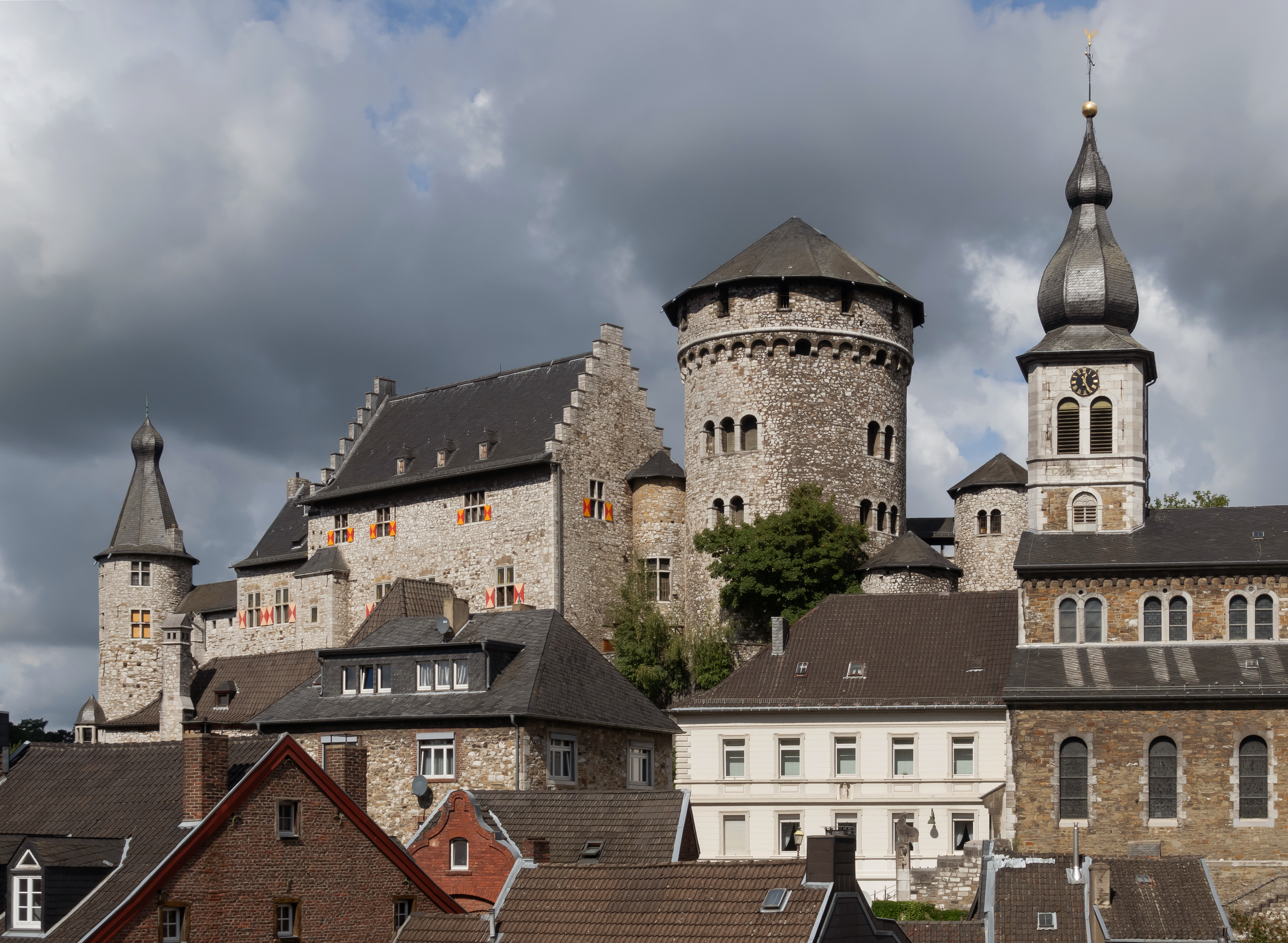
- Burg Stolberg

- Coat of arms

- Location of Stolberg within Aachen district
- Interactive map of Stolberg
- Location within Germany Location within North Rhine-Westphalia
- Coordinates: 50°46′N 6°14′E
- Country: Germany
- State: North Rhine-Westphalia
- Admin. region: Köln
- District: Aachen
- Subdivisions: 17

Government
  - Mayor (2019–25): Patrick Haas (SPD)

Area
  - Total: 98.48 km^{2} (38.02 sq mi)
- Elevation: 260 m (850 ft)

Population (2025-12-31)
  - Total: 57,678
  - Density: 585.7/km^{2} (1,517/sq mi)
- Time zone: UTC+01:00 (CET)
  - Summer (DST): UTC+02:00 (CEST)
- Postal codes: 52222, 52223, 52224
- Dialling codes: 02402, 02408 (Venwegen), 02409 (Gressenich/ Werth/ Schevenhütte)
- Vehicle registration: AC
- Website: www.stolberg.de

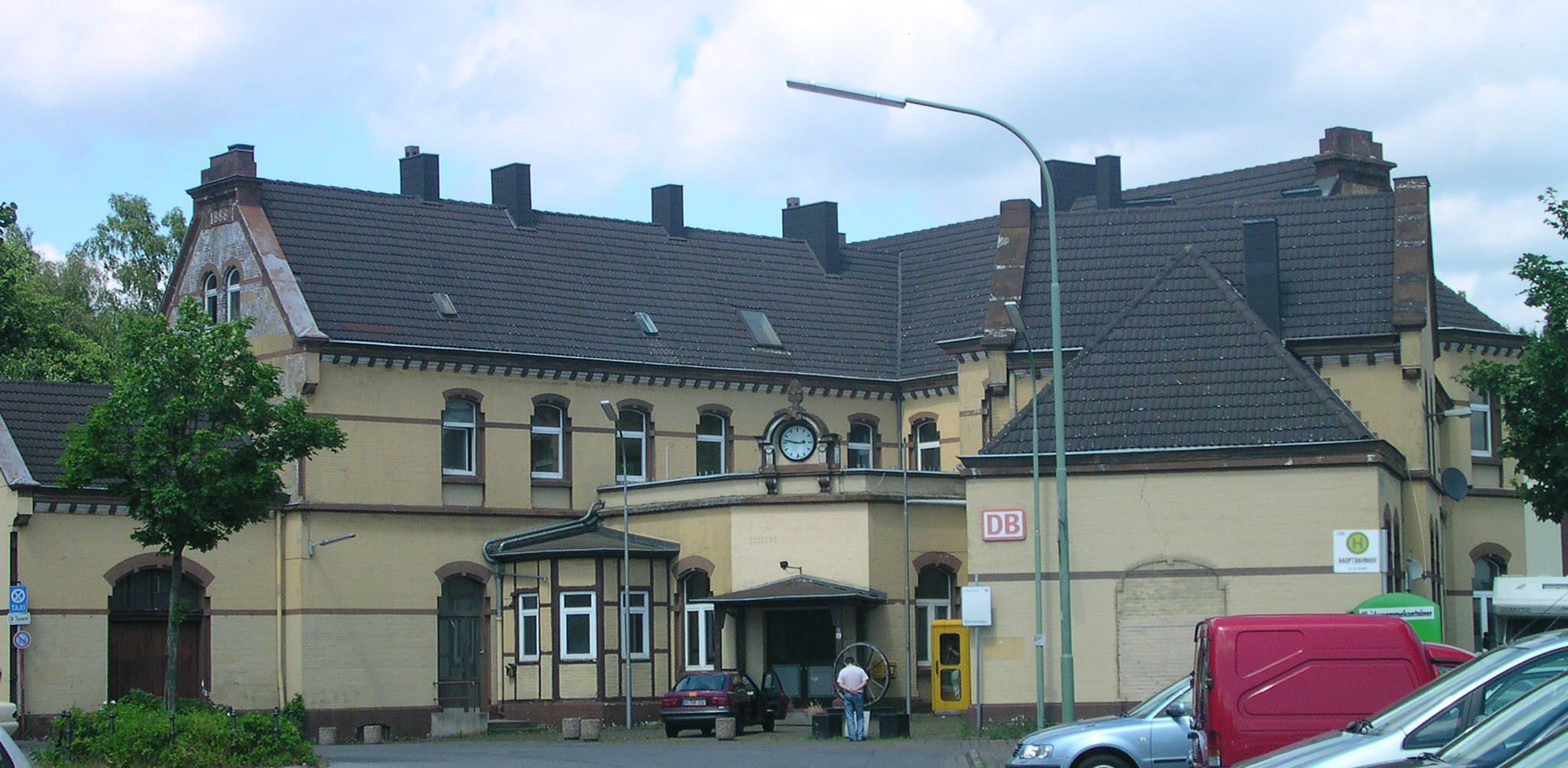
Main railway station

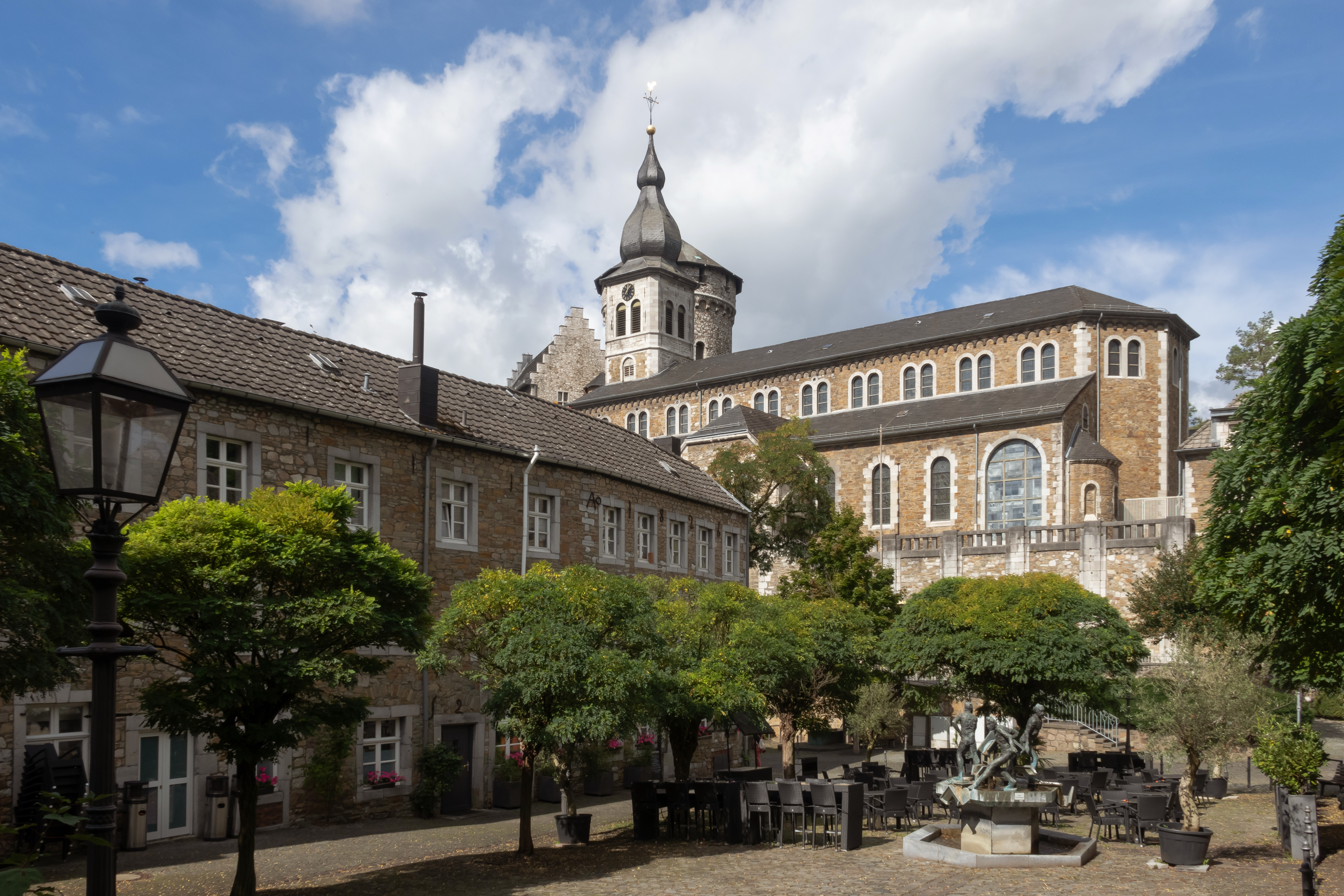
Catholic church: Pfarrkirche Sankt Lucia vom Alten Markt

Stolberg (German pronunciation: [ˈʃtɔlbɛʁk], Ripuarian: Stolbersch) is a town in North Rhine-Westphalia, Germany. It has a long history as an industrial town and belongs to the district Aachen and the lower district court of Eschweiler.

== Geography ==
Stolberg is located approximately 5 km east of Aachen in a valley at the fringes of the Eifel which begins in the East with the Hürtgenwald and in the South in the municipality of Monschau. It borders Eschweiler in the north and the Aachen city district of Eilendorf in the west.

The core of Stolberg is commonly divided into Unterstolberg (Lower Stolberg) and Oberstolberg (Upper Stolberg) which includes most of the old parts of Stolberg. Other parts of Stolberg are Atsch, Büsbach, Donnerberg, Münsterbusch. In addition the villages of Breinig, Dorff, Gressenich, Mausbach, Schevenhütte, Venwegen, Vicht, Werth, and Zweifall.

== History ==
Stolberg is first mentioned in documents from the 12th century. It became an important centre of brass production when Protestant brass producers resettled to Stolberg from Aachen around 1600 to escape religious persecution and economic restrictions. The nickname of Stolberg, Die Kupferstadt (the Copper City), thus derives not from copper but from brass, "yellow copper". The Kupferhöfe (copper yards) where brass was originally produced and the brass manufacturers built their mansions remain as reminders of the brass manufacturers that dominated Stolberg and its economy.

Stolberg lost its importance as a brass producer when pure zinc became available in the middle of the 19th century. Many brass producers moved into other industries, especially the glass and textile industries, or specialized in the mass production of haberdashery.

Stolberg belonged to the Duchy of Jülich until 1794, when it became occupied by France and part of the Canton of Eschweiler in the Département de la Roer. After the Congress of Vienna in 1815, Stolberg became part of the Kingdom of Prussia.

Stolberg acquired notoriety in the 1960s as the residence of Contergan producer Grünenthal. Because of its heavy industry, Stolberg has become associated with diseases of metal poisoning, literally "Gressenich cadmium cattle-dying" disease and "Stolberg lead children" disease.

Stolberg has a significant ultra-right history, e.g., as the headquarters of the Wiking-Jugend from 1967 to 1991 and as a place of NPD activities.

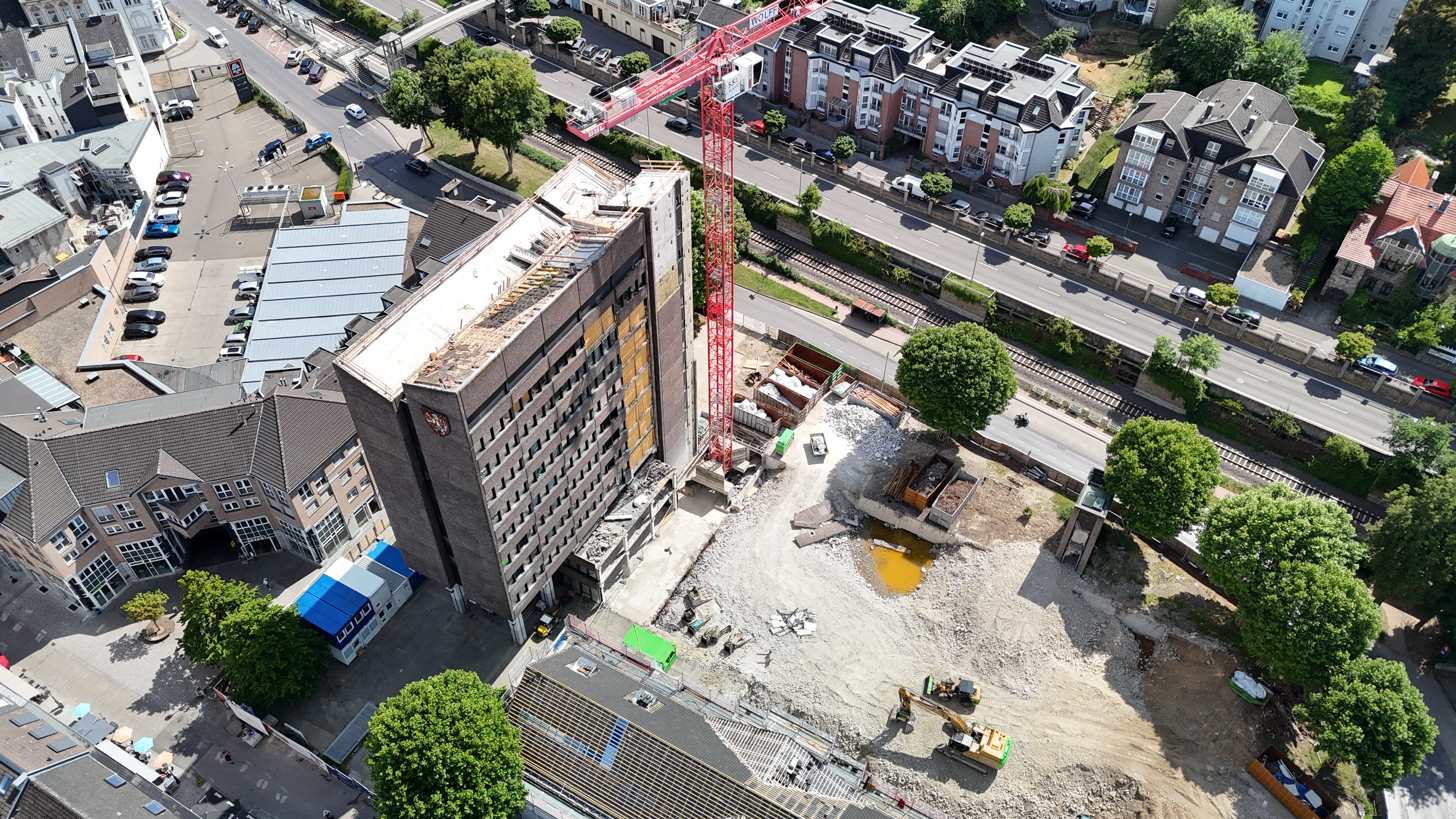
Demolition work at the town hall

Large parts of the central axis of the valley and the villages of Zweifall, Vicht and Atsch were severely affected by the 2021 European floods. One of the buildings affected by the destruction was the town hall, which is getting demolished and will replaced by a new building.

== Population ==
Historical population

Year	Pop.	±% p.a.
1965	54,303	—
1970	56,272	+0.71%
1975	57,373	+0.39%
1980	57,541	+0.06%
1985	56,435	−0.39%
1990	57,231	+0.28%
1995	58,203	+0.34%

Year	Pop.	±% p.a.
2000	58,682	+0.16%
2005	58,577	−0.04%
2010	57,474	−0.38%
2015	56,739	−0.26%
2020	56,377	−0.13%
2025	57,678	+0.46%

Source: Landesdatabank Nordrhein-Westfalen

== Main sights ==
The town's landmark is a castle which was rebuilt at the beginning of the 20th century at the location of the former medieval castle of Stolberg. Other remarkable old buildings are the Kupferhöfe (Copper yards) and the old town in general.

At the eastern border of the territory of Stolberg is the Wehebachtalsperre (Beck Wehe reservoir) which includes a lookout point.

== Transport ==
Although Stolberg lacks direct Autobahn access, the next autobahns are easily accessible via the neighbouring towns of Aachen and Eschweiler. Stolberg Hauptbahnhof (central station) is on the Cologne–Aachen railway and served by a Regional-Express train every half-hour. Several smaller stations in the centre of Stolberg are connected to Aachen (district) and Düren (district) by the euregiobahn, a slower regional train.

== Sports ==
Stolberg has several football, handball, gymnastics, swimming, tennis clubs and a few traditional shooting clubs.

Other sports clubs include the gliding club Luftsportverein Stolberg, situated at the Diepenlinchen Airfield and the regionally successful artistic cycling club RSC Münsterbusch.

== Twin towns – sister cities ==
Stolberg (Rhineland) is twinned with:

- Faches-Thumesnil, France (1989)
- Stolberg (Südharz), Germany (1990)
- Valognes, France (1990/1991)

== Notable people ==
- Johann Wilhelm Meigen (1764–1845), entomologist
- Viktor Holtz (1846–1919), educator.
- Heinz Bennent (1921–2011), actor.
- Anton Resch (1921–1975), fighter pilot.
- Walter Hilgers (born 1959), conductor.
- Margitta Mazzocchi (born 1963), politician in West Virginia.
- LaFee (born 1990), singer.
- Manuel Krauthausen (born 1992), politician
- Pia Filler (born 1998), professional pool player.

== See also ==
- Stolberg (Harz), Saxony-Anhalt, Germany
- Stollberg
- Schevenhütte Quarry
