= Manuel Krauthausen =

German politician (born 1992)

Member of the Bundestag
- Incumbent
- Assumed office March 2025
- Constituency: North Rhine-Westphalia

Personal details
- Born: 12 May 1992 (age 33) Stolberg (Rhineland)
- Party: Alternative for Germany

Manuel Johannes Krauthausen (born 12 May 1992 in Stolberg) is a German politician who was elected as a member of the Bundestag in 2025. He works as a master chimney sweep.
