= Richard Holzer =

Panamanian architect (1923–2021)

Richard Holzer (Vienna, Austria, 1923 – 26 January 2021) was an Austrian-born Panamanian architect, considered one of the most influential Panamanian architects.

== Early life and education ==
He was born in Vienna in 1923 and came to Panama with his family in 1937.

He graduated from the Faculty of Engineering and Architecture of the University of Panama in 1951. He obtained a master's degree in Bioclimatic Architecture at the University of California, Berkeley.

He won numerous local and international awards for his work. He died in Panama.

== Notable projects ==
- Credicorp Bank Tower
