= Viktor Holtz =

German educator (1846–1919)

- Born: May 3, 1846; Stolberg (Rheinland), Prussia
- Died: September 3, 1919 (aged 73); Poznań, Poland

Viktor Holtz (3 May 1846 – 3 September 1919) was a German educator and a pioneer of German-Japanese academic and cultural relations.

== Early life ==
Holtz was born in Stolberg, Kingdom of Prussia, and studied, from 1865 to 1867, at the Royal Catholic Teacher's Academy in Kempen.

== Professional career ==
He subsequently became a teacher in Aachen and on November 1, 1869 he was in charge of teacher training at the teacher's academy at Boppard. On December 20, 1870, at the request of the Meiji government of Japan, the Prussiann Minister of Education dispatched him because of his knowledge of foreign languages and his other qualifications as a foreign advisor on a 3-year contract to Tokyo. Together with the more famous military surgeons Theodor Eduard Hoffmann and Leopold Benjamin Müller, he belonged to the first group of Germans whom Prussia dispatched to modernize and westernize schools of higher education in Japan.

At first, Holtz was attached to the Southern College (Daigaku Nankō; a predecessor to Tokyo Imperial University); from 1872, Holtz' School was at least nominally independent. The name was changed from "First School of Foreign Learning" and "2nd Middle School" into "German School". Holtz remained the sole teacher for all eleven subjects. Due to a change of the Japanese educational policy, this school was merged into the Kaisei School in August 1873. At the same time, Holtz was transferred to the Tokyo Medical School (Tokyo Igakkō) for the remainder of his contract, which had been extended by 8 months twice. Therefore, inconsistent educational planning terminated the pioneer experiment of a German school in Japan without direct lasting effects.

On October 1, 1874, he returned to Boppard and took over after the appointment of J. Hoffmann to the district school inspector teaching in mathematics, German and piano and was transferred in 1877 to Prüm (near Koblenz), in 1889 to Schrimm and in 1902 to Poznań, Poland where he died in 1919.
