= Marie Holzer =

Austrian writer and journalist

Marie Holzer (née Rosenzweig; 11 January 1874 in Czernowitz – 5 June 1924 in Innsbruck) was an Austrian writer and journalist.

== Early and personal life ==
Marie Holzer was born in 1874 to Jewish banker, City and Municipal Council, Reichsrat deputy and writer Leon Rosenzweig (1840–1914) in Czernowitz, the provincial capital of the Austrian Crown Land Bukovina. Together with seven siblings (a younger brother was the later lawyer and writer Walther Rode, 1876–1934), she grew up in a well-protected, well-to-do environment in an assimilated upper-middle-class family.

In 1895 she married the Austrian-Hungarian officer Johann (Hans) Holzer (1866–1924) in Czernowitz. The marriage of the couple, who were very different in character, was characterised by tensions and conflicts from the very beginning. The conservative and highly jealous Johann Holzer had little interest in his wife's artistic and literary inclinations. Their daughter Edith was born in 1896, their son Rudolf in 1897 and their second daughter, Gertrude, in 1904.

== Writing ==
During a longer stay in Prague, where her husband taught at the Cadet School, Marie Holzer began to get involved in the Austrian women's movement around 1907 and published several articles in the Vienna magazine Neues Frauenleben. From 1907, she published numerous essayistic and narrative prose texts in the renowned Prager Tagblatt. In 1911, she joined the circle around Franz Pfemfert's expressionistischer Die Aktion magazine and published there in the following years, as well as in many other newspapers and magazines (including in the Frankfurter Zeitung, the Leipziger Neueste Nachrichten, the Berliner Tageblatt, Die Wage, Der Demokrat, Die Muskete, Die Ähre, Die Schaubühne, Die neue Rundschau, März, Jugend) her literary works, political-social-critical and poetic texts, prose sketches, poetry, dramatic scenes, essays, reviews and glosses. Her importance as an expressionist author is clearly documented by the fact that one of her short stories, The Red Wig (1914), gave its title to an anthology of prose texts by expressionist poets published in 1996. Marie Holzer's only book, the collection of stories Im Schattenreich der Seele. Thirteen Momentbilder, whose central theme is the Eros] and Thanatos motif, was published in 1911. It was a "book of the so-called modern woman", judged the writer Nadja Strasser in the Aktion: "But, I swear, it is nevertheless a good and likeable little book. And the modern man can read it. Yes, he should read it. Perhaps he will find some things in it that will give him new thoughts and new feelings".

== Later life ==
Around 1914, Marie Holzer and her family moved to Innsbruck. Her husband, who retired as a major in the spring of 1914, re-entered military service after the outbreak of World War I. With the loss of the war in 1918, a world collapsed for him, previously elevated to the peerage and Oberst des Generalstabes, whereas a socially freer, democratic life opened up for his wife. Marie Holzer had already turned to the Austrian Social Democratic Party during the war and provided humanitarian aid to the poor, hungry and sick – much to her husband's annoyance. The marital conflicts thus intensified. On 5 June 1924, Johann Holzer shot Marie Holzer and then himself in their Innsbruck flat.

== Legacy ==
Marie Holzer is considered to be an important author of the women's emancipation and expressionist movement in the early 20th century and as a writer of masterful 'short prose'. Anne Martina Emonts emphasised Marie Holzer's literary art as she "knows how to describe the smallest units of the soul"; She was one of the important authors "who for the first time (...) gave women a critical, doubting voice".

== Publications ==
- Im Schattenreich der Seele. Dreizehn Momentbilder. Bruno Volger Verlagsbuchhandlung, Leipzig-Gohlis 1911; Neuausgabe: Magazin-Verlag Ad. Dreßler, Leipzig-Möckern 1913.
- Texte. Ausgewählt v. Anne Martina Emonts. In: Juni – Magazin für Literatur und Kultur. Nr. 45/46: Schreibende Frauen. Ein Schaubild im frühen 20. Jahrhundert. Hrsg. v. Gregor Ackermann u. Walter Delabar. Aisthesis Verlag, Bielefeld 2011, ISBN 978-3-89528-857-9, S. 282–302.

=== Literature ===
- Gerd Baumgartner: Marie Holzer (1874–1924). In: Juni – Magazin für Literatur und Kultur. Nr. 45/46: Schreibende Frauen. Ein Schaubild im frühen 20. Jahrhundert. Hrsg. v. Gregor Ackermann u. Walter Delabar. Aisthesis Verlag, Bielefeld 2011, ISBN 978-3-89528-857-9, S. 253–255.
- Peter Demetz: Prager Literaten in „Sturm“ und „Aktion“. In: Berlin und der Prager Kreis. Hrsg. v. Margarita Pazi u. Hans Dieter Zimmermann. Königshausen & Neumann, Würzburg 1991, ISBN 3-88479-597-X, S. 101–109.
- Anne Martina Emonts: „Wie lieb ich die Türe meines Zimmers“. Zum Werk Marie Holzers. In: Juni – Magazin für Literatur und Kultur. Nr. 45/46: Schreibende Frauen. Ein Schaubild im frühen 20. Jahrhundert. Hrsg. v. Gregor Ackermann u. Walter Delabar. Aisthesis Verlag, Bielefeld 2011, S. 303–310.
- Christian Jäger: Minoritäre Literatur. Das Konzept der kleinen Literatur am Beispiel prager- und sudetendeutscher Werke. Deutscher Universitäts-Verlag, Wiesbaden 2005, ISBN 3-8244-4607-3, S. 249–266.
- Dorit Müller: Gefährliche Fahrten. Das Automobil in Literatur und Film um 1900. Königshausen & Neumann, Würzburg 2004, ISBN 3-8260-2672-1, S. 104–108.
- Christine Riccabona: Anmerkungen zu zwei Briefen im Nachlass Ludwig von Fickers und zu deren Verfasserin Marie Holzer. In: Mitteilungen aus dem Brenner-Archiv. Nr. 31, 2012, S. 127–136.
- Christine Riccabona: Gedanken über die Literaturkritik von Marie Holzer. In: LiLit – Literarisches Leben in Tirol. Nr. 1, Juni 2012 (https://literaturtirol.at/lilit).
