= Jeffrey T. Polzer =

American academic

- Education: University of Wisconsin-Stevens Point; Texas Christian University; Northwestern University's Kellogg Graduate School of Management
- Occupation: Academic
- Employer: Harvard Business School

Jeffrey T. Polzer is an American academic. He is the UPS Foundation Professor at Harvard Business School, and the co-editor of a book. He studies how people collaborate in teams and across organizational networks to accomplish their individual and collective goals.

== Selected Publications ==
- Evan DeFilippis; Stephen Michael Impink; Madison Singell; Jeffrey T. Polzer; Raffaella Sadun (2022). "The impact of COVID-19 on digital communication patterns". Humanities and Social Sciences Communications. 9 (1). doi:10.1057/s41599-022-01190-9. Wikidata Q114380501.
- Jennifer A. Chatman; Jeffrey T. Polzer; Sigal G. Barsade; Margaret A. Neale (1998). "Being Different Yet Feeling Similar: The Influence of Demographic Composition and Organizational Culture on Work Processes and Outcomes". Administrative Science Quarterly. 43 (4): 749–780. doi:10.2307/2393615. JSTOR 2393615. Wikidata Q110869307.
- Neale, M., E. Mannix, and J. Polzer, eds. Identity Issues in Groups. Vol. 5, Research on Managing Groups and Teams. Stamford, CT: JAI Press, 2003
