= Holzmann =

Holzmann is a German surname. Notable people with the surname include:

- Abe Holzmann (1874–1939), German/American composer, who is most famous today for his march Blaze-Away
- Gerard J. Holzmann (born 1951), American computer scientist, best known as the developer of the SPIN model checker
- Felix Holzmann (1921–2002), Czech comedian
- Johannes Holzmann (1882–1914), German anarchist
- Marcel Holzmann (born 1990), Austrian footballer who plays for FC Lustenau
- Olly Holzmann (1915–1995), Austrian actress
- Thomas Holzmann (born 1987), German professional ice hockey forward

== See also ==
- Philipp Holzmann, German construction company based in Frankfurt am Main
- Holzman
