= Carl Holtz =

American rower

Carl Alexander Holtz (December 11, 1920 in Milwaukee, Wisconsin – July 8, 2006 in Waukesha, Wisconsin) was a local conservationist, former USAAF officer, and All-American stroke in intercollegiate crew. He was inducted into the Wisconsin Athletic Hall of Fame and the National Crew Hall of Fame, and he is regarded as one of the most powerful strokes to ever sit in a shell.

== Life ==
While just a toddler, Holtz was abandoned by his father. Finances were such that Carl would have to take a job with the local Sears Roebuck store, a position he held for two years until he had saved up enough money to afford collegiate tuition.

Carl enrolled in the College of Agriculture at the University of Wisconsin–Madison. One of his most influential professors was the famed Aldo Leopold, who passed along a deep appreciation for the land and a sense of conservationism.

Athletics, sports, and activities were very important to Carl, as he felt he always had to be active or doing something. On a whim, he joined the Badger football team as a freshman, and remained on the Freshman/Junior Varsity team for the year (in those days, football programs had dedicated lower-level teams beneath Varsity, and "redshirting" was not yet existent). There, he encountered the likes of All-American Pat Harder, who he befriended and who...

... taught me a thing or two about leverage. He was such a nice guy about it. He'd knock me down, help me back up, and then explain how he did it... Only to knock me down again on the next play.

— Carl Holtz

Holtz enlisted in the United States Army Air Force late in 1942 and was sent off for training in Kansas and Texas. He was given the class-nickname of "Tarzan".

He was cross-trained, and received both a navigator's badge and a bombardier's badge. He flew many bombing missions over Germany.

CHAMPION OARSMAN

He was unsurpassed as a stroke in University of Wisconsin rowing. He led his crew of 8 - some of whom were to become his friends for life - to win the prestigious Eastern Sprints in 1946, the same year he was named All-American. In 1948 Holtz followed his rowing coach, Allen Walz, to Yale, where he coached the freshman crew.

Joint-owner in a Connecticut blueberry farm, he decided to move back home to Wisconsin to look for a larger farm on which to raise his growing family. In 1957 Holtz purchased a dilapidated farm just outside Mukwonago, Wisconsin known as Mayflower Farm, a misnomer for the wild Pasque flowers that grow on its prairies.

To supplement income for his family, Holtz took up a job as a Rural Letter Carrier in the area, servicing the villages and towns of Mukwonago, Vernon, Caldwell, and North Prairie.

== Death ==
Carl Holtz died, quietly, from complications due to Alzheimer's disease early in the morning of July 8, 2006. He had been diagnosed with the disease approximately three years earlier.

== Notables ==
- On June 7, a week prior to the June 13, 1948 "25th Anniversary of the Opening of Yankee Stadium" celebration the New York Yankees hosted, Babe Ruth visited Yale to present his autobiographical manuscript to the Yale baseball team. A parade was improvised, and Holtz was quickly approached to lend his grey Chevrolet convertible to transport Ruth down the parade route. Holtz owned the only convertible in New Haven, and thus drove the "Sultan of Swat" around the campus and presented him for the dedication ceremony. At the field, team captain George H. W. Bush received the manuscript.
- The current Varsity-8 shell for UW's men's crew is named the Carl Holtz '47 in his honor.

== External sources ==
- Milwaukee Journal-Sentinel Article
- Babe Ruth Donates His Manuscript to Yale
