= Robert Holczer =

Hungarian Holocaust survivor (1929–2017)

- Born: August 31, 1929; Budapest, Hungary
- Died: August 28, 2017 (aged 87)
- Occupation: Teacher

Robert Holczer (August 31, 1929 – August 28, 2017) was a Holocaust survivor, teacher, and resident of Hungary, Israel, Germany, and the United States. Items commemorating Holczer's Holocaust survival are stored in the special collections of the United States Holocaust Memorial Museum in Washington, D.C. The third chapter of This is Home Now: Kentucky's Holocaust Survivors Speak is devoted to him.

== Museum pieces ==
Robert Holczer's Holocaust survival is documented in the special collections of the United States Holocaust Memorial Museum in Washington, D.C.

=== Robert Holczer Collection ===
Consists of four postcards sent between 1942 and 1944 from Robert Holczer's father, Lajos Holczer, to Robert Holczer and his mother.

=== Robert Holczer Papers ===
Consists of the false papers used by Robert Holczer and his mother, Kornelia Holczer née Oestreicher, to keep their Jewish identities hidden during the Holocaust and verify their status as clinic workers.

=== Oral History Interview with Robert Holczer ===
Consists of an interview with Robert Holczer about his life with a focus on his Holocaust survival.

== Early life ==
Holczer was born in Budapest on August 31, 1929, to parents Lajos Holczer and Kornelia Holczer née Oestreicher.

=== Holocaust survival ===
Holczer avoided deportation from Budapest because he had stayed home from his work battalion assignment the day his group was taken to a concentration camp. His father was separated from the family on several occasions and sent to a concentration camp. He survived due to the liberation of Budapest by the Yugoslavian Partisans. Holczer and his mother survived the Nazi Occupation and the Siege of Budapest with false papers by moving into a house that functioned as a makeshift clinic intended for Nazi collaborators. The lives of 440 Jews were saved by the clinic, run by Ara Jeretzian. Holczer worked there as an errand boy. One of his tasks was taking severed limbs from the operating room of his makeshift clinic hiding place and stacking them outside.

== Adulthood ==
Holczer illegally left Hungary for Israel a few weeks before he would have completed hisgymnasium schooling, by passing through the American section of Vienna. Holczer spent his time in Israel living in a kibbutz along the Jordan border. Holczer returned to Hungary in 1950 due to homesickness and communist propaganda. There, he was shunned for his time in the West before obtaining a degree in geography through a fortunate series of events and became a geography teacher.
Holczer illegally left Hungary again in 1956. He intended to go to Sweden but went to the US city of St. Louis, Missouri, instead. From there, Holczer moved to Aspen, Colorado. After that, he worked first in Alaska, then Fresno, California, where he obtained a master's degree in history. He then moved to the San Francisco Bay Area, where he met his wife. He became a history teacher.

Holczer spent a year in Germany before moving back to the US to marry his wife. He proceeded to spend nineteen years living in Germany. He later moved back to the US to Paris, Kentucky, before moving to Portland, Oregon, and then Vancouver, Washington. Holczer spent time later in life speaking to school children about his time during the Holocaust until he was no longer able to due to the state of his health.

== See also ==
- Holocaust victims
