= Sabine Holtz =

German historian (born 1959)

- Born: 16 September 1959 (age 66); Süßen, Baden-Württemberg
- Occupation: Professor at University of Stuttgart

Sabine Holtz (born 16 September 1959) is a German historian who holds the position of Chair of Regional History at the University of Stuttgart. Since 2015, she has also been the head of the Commission for Regional Historical Studies in Baden-Württemberg.

== Selected works ==
- Holtz, Sabine (1993). "Theologie und Alltag. Leben und Lehre in den Predigten der Tübinger Theologen 1550–1750". Spätmittelalter und Reformation (Dissertation) (3). Tübingen.
- Holtz, Sabine (2002). "Bildung und Herrschaft. Zur Verwissenschaftlichung politischer Führungsschichten im 17. Jahrhundert". Schriften zur südwestdeutschen Landeskunde (Postdoctoral thesis) (32). Leinfelden-Echterdingen.
- Eisler, Jakob; Haag, Norbert; Holtz, Sabine (2003). Kultureller Wandel in Palästina im frühen 20. Jahrhundert : eine Bilddokumentation. Epfendorf: Bibliotheca-Academica-Verl. ISBN 9783928471558.
- Holtz, Sabine (2011). Predigt: Religiöser Transfer über Postillen. Veröffentlichungen der Kommission für Geschichtliche Landeskunde in Baden-Württemberg : Reihe B, Forschungen. Mainz: Institut für Europäische Geschichte. ISBN 9783170365230.
- Holtz, Sabine; Maier, Gerald (2017). Von der Monarchie zur Republik : Beiträge zur Demokratiegeschichte des deutschen Südwestens 1918-1923. Stuttgart: W. Kohlhammer Verlag. ISBN 9783170365247.
