= Felix Holzmann =

Czech actor, comedian, and screenwriter

- Born: 8 July 1921; Teplice, Czechoslovakia
- Died: 13 September 2002 (aged 81); Chemnitz, Germany
- Notable work: Humoriády Felixe Holzmanna, Včera, dnes a zítra, Ukulele
- Spouse(s): Eva Holzmannová, Barbara Greif-Holzmann

Comedy career
- Years active: 1950s–2002
- Medium: Stand up, television
- Genres: Comedy, satire, black comedy

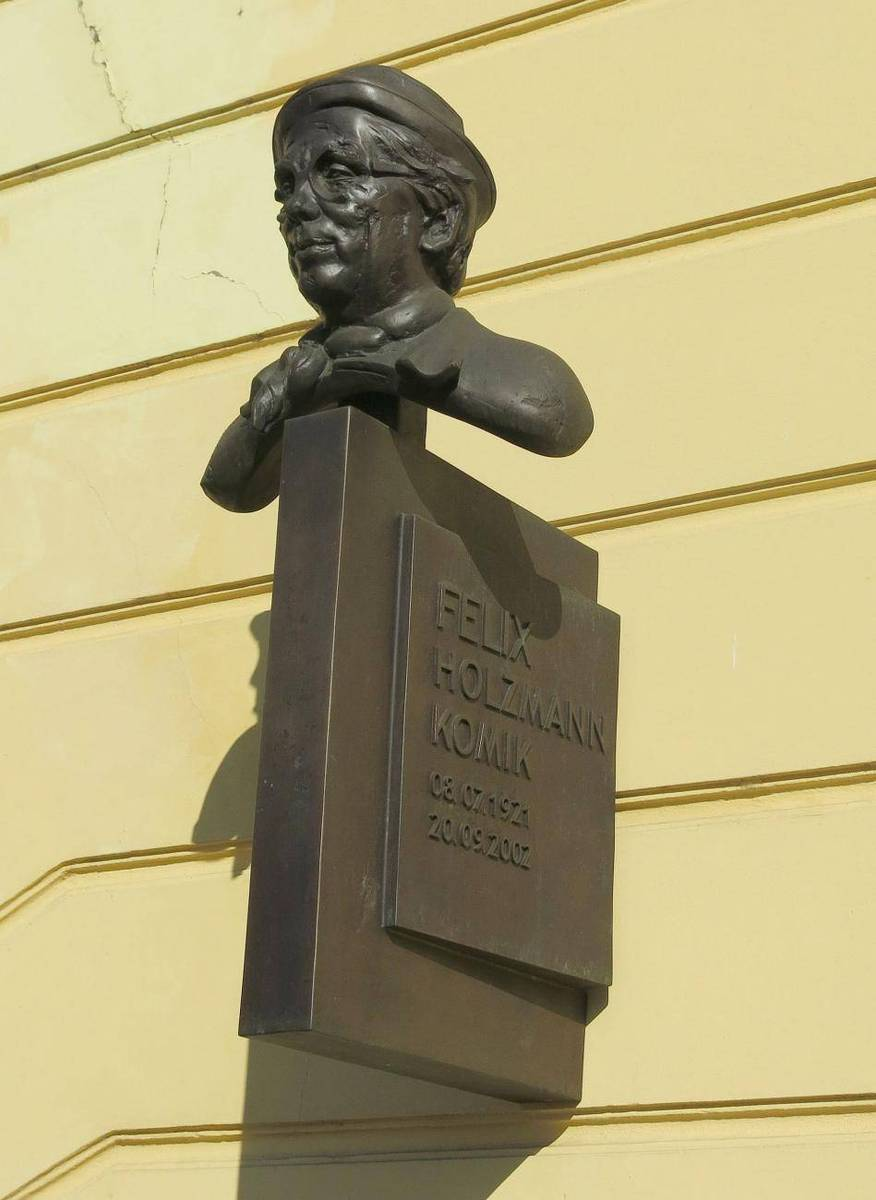
Memorial plaque and bust of the comedian in Litoměřice

Felix Holzmann (8 July 1921 – 13 September 2002) was a Czech comedian and screenwriter. He was known for his unique wordplay humor, way of speech, and look.

== Personal life ==
Holzmann came from a Bohemian German family originally from Teplice, which soon moved to Litoměřice. As a German citizen of the Sudetenland during the Second World War, he served in Wehrmacht, at the naval artillery in Denmark. At the end of the war, he was taken prisoner by the Soviets and spent one year in the gulag. He never talked about his war experience and it was not revealed until his death.

He graduated from a business school in Ústí nad Labem, but later he became a professional comedian, perfectly fluent both in Czech and in German.

Holzmann was married twice, first to Eva Vorlíčková, a war widow, whose daughter Eva he adopted. Although they lived together from 1946 and had a daughter together, Irena, they remained unmarried for two decades, so that Eva would not lose her widow's pension, which was an essential income source for the family. They consequently married as late as in 1968 once Holzmann had broken through as a comedian. However, as he became popular and started touring extensively, his wife began to feel lonely and useless, sank into depression and in 1970 she committed suicide. Holzmann was devastated and felt responsible for the rest of his life.

Holzmann then met and eventually married Barbara Greif, a German actress and singer 25 years his junior, with whom he then also toured and performed. The couple moved to East Germany, but he kept returning to perform and record in Czechoslovakia, where he remained very popular.

He died aged 81 in his home Chemnitz on 13 September 2002.

== Style ==
Holzmann's humor consisted in precisely-structured dialogues full of unexpected interpretations of words and phrases, and other wordplay, so most of it is virtually untranslatable. Its essentially linguistic and apolitical nature meant that it was largely acceptable for the Czechoslovak communist censorship, and also that it appealed broad audience.

In his scenes, he wore typical props consisting of a small straw hat (a so-called "tralaláček"), a neckerchief, and large round horn-rimmed glasses. He also developed a distinctive accent characterised by an interrogative singsong tone at word-endings.

Holzmann occasionally wrote monologues, but more typically, his sketches were dialogues, where he talked to some straight man struggling with his extreme slow-wittedness. His favourite partner was František Budín, who, however, was not a professional artist and refused to leave his occupation as an accountant. Thus, Holzmann also cooperated with various other popular comedians, actors, and singers, like Lubomír Lipský, Iva Janžurová, Miloslav Šimek and Karel Gott.

== Filmography ==
- 1993 Deset malých běloušků (TV film)

Documentary

- 2010 Komici na jedničku
- 2006 Buďte pozdraven, pane Jouda! (TV film)

TV

- 2012 Legendy: Felix Holzmann: Včera, dnes a zítra
- 2010 Deset zastavení s mistry zábavy
- 2006 To nejlepší z televizního humoru
- 2004 Felix Holzmann: Včera, dnes a zítra
- Řekněte mi, kdo to je
- Tak mi tedy řekněte
- 2003 Odkud já vás znám
- Silvestrovské taneční hodiny
- 2001 Ať se lidi mají rádi...aspoň dnes
- 1999 Co takhle dát si Gotta
- 1997 Proč bychom se nebavili, když nám Pánbůh archiv dal
- Úsměvy
- 1992 Šance
- 1990 Šaráda
- 1987 Zajíc v pytli
- 1985 Humoriády Felixe Holzmanna
- Kavárnička dříve narozených
- 1978 Silvestr hravý a dravý
- 1973 Zpívá Karel Gott
