= Joanie Holzer Schirm =

Author, entrepreneur, and community activist

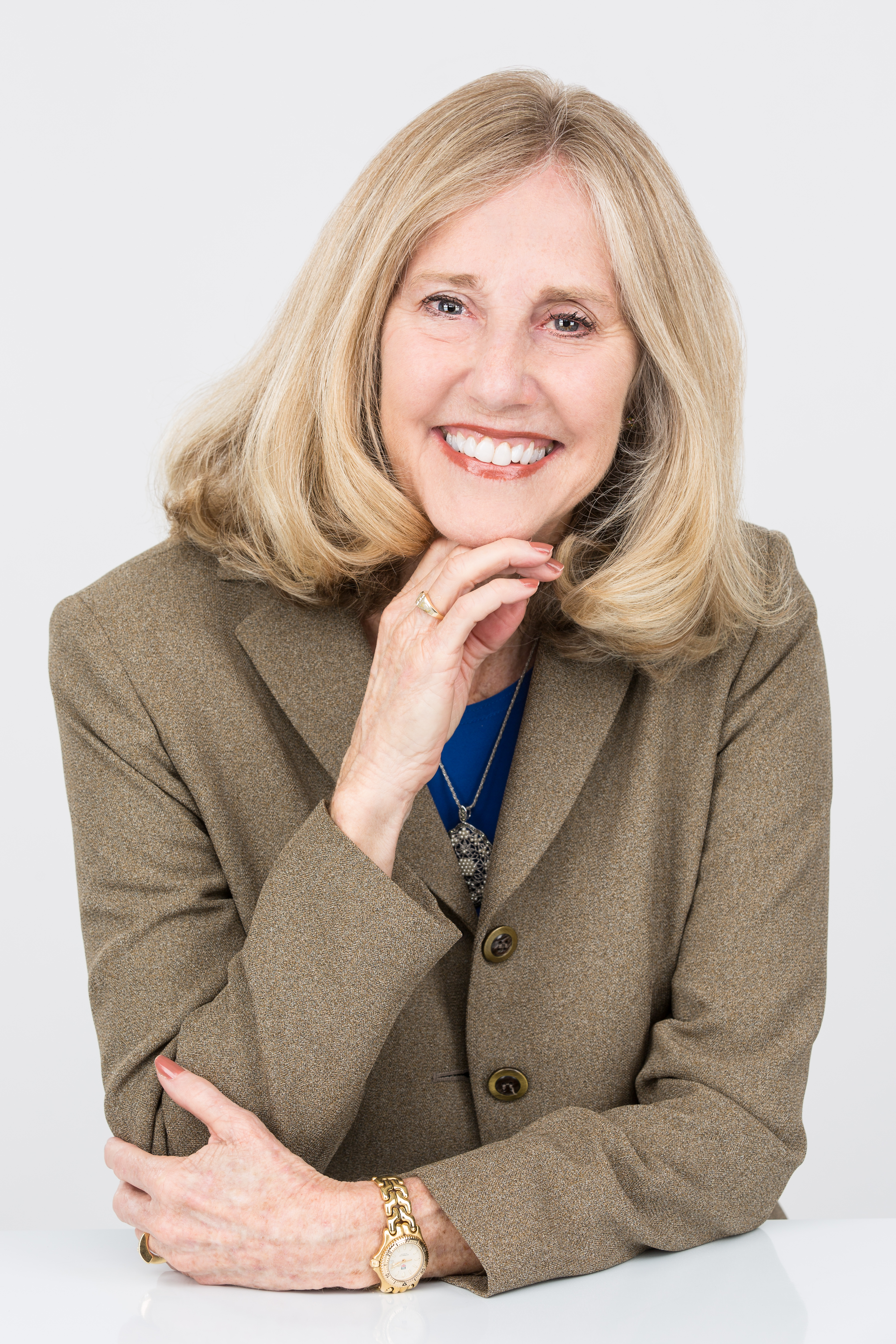
- Born: December 15, 1948 (age 77); Chattahoochee, Florida

Joanie Holzer Schirm (born December 15, 1948) is an author, entrepreneur, and community activist. In 1991, she founded Geotechnical and Environmental Consultants, Inc. and served as the president until her retirement in 2008, when she sold the company. She served for 35 years in the business of engineering in management and marketing roles in Atlanta and Orlando and in numerous community leadership efforts, most notably as the founding volunteer president of the Central Florida Sports Commission and chair of Orlando's successful bid and host committee for the 1994 FIFA World Cup.

After her retirement, Schirm began researching her father's past, inspired by discovering a collection of 400 letters that were found after his death in 2000. Her father, Oswald Holzer, a Czech Jewish doctor, left Prague for Shanghai in 1939, soon after the German occupation of Czechoslovakia began on March 15, 1939, prior to the start of World War II. This research has led to Schirm publishing two books: Adventurers Against Their Will, winner of the 2013 Global Ebook Award for Biography Non-Fiction and My Dear Boy, published by Potomac Books, an imprint of University of Nebraska Press in March 2019.

The letters now constitute the Holzer Collection, which has been called by the United States Holocaust Memorial Museum former chief archivist, Henry Mayer, “one of the most complete personal collections of WWII correspondence seen in years.” There have been exhibits of the Holzer Collection in Prague, Frankfurt, and Orlando. In April 2019, a permanent exhibit, called Displaced Person, opened at the Holocaust Memorial Resource and Education Center of Florida, featuring the letters, artifacts, and photos. Schirm serves as a capital campaign co-chair for the Holocaust Museum for Hope & Humanity in downtown Orlando.
