= Richard E. Holz =

Richard E Holz (30 October 1914 – August 15, 1986), was an American brass band composer, served as Chaplain to the U.S. Army Air Forces in New Guinea, Philippines and Japan. He married Ruby Walker in 1941. After the war, Holz was active in the Salvation Army as a commissioner. He was the head of its Eastern Territorial Music Department and served as bandmaster of the New York Staff Band for 18 years. In 1971, he was appointed chief secretary in Australia and New Guinea. In 1974, he was appointed commander of the western Territory and in 1982, commander of the Central Territory.
