= Holzman =

Holzman is a surname. Notable people with the surname include:

- Adam Holzman (guitarist) (born 1960), American classical guitarist
- Adam Holzman (keyboardist) (born 1958), American jazz keyboardist
- Eli Holzman (born 1974), American creator–developer, writer, and producer
- Helene Holzman (1891–1968), German painter and author
- Jac Holzman (born 1931), the founder, chief executive officer and head of both Elektra Records and Nonesuch Records
- Jacquelin Holzman (born 1936), mayor of Ottawa, Canada, from 1991 to 1997
- Liz Holzman (1953–2014), American film producer and director
- Malcolm Holzman (born 1940), American architect and founding partner of Holzman Moss Bottino Architecture
- Philip Holzman (1922–2004), the Esther and Sidney R. Rabb Professor of Psychology at Harvard University
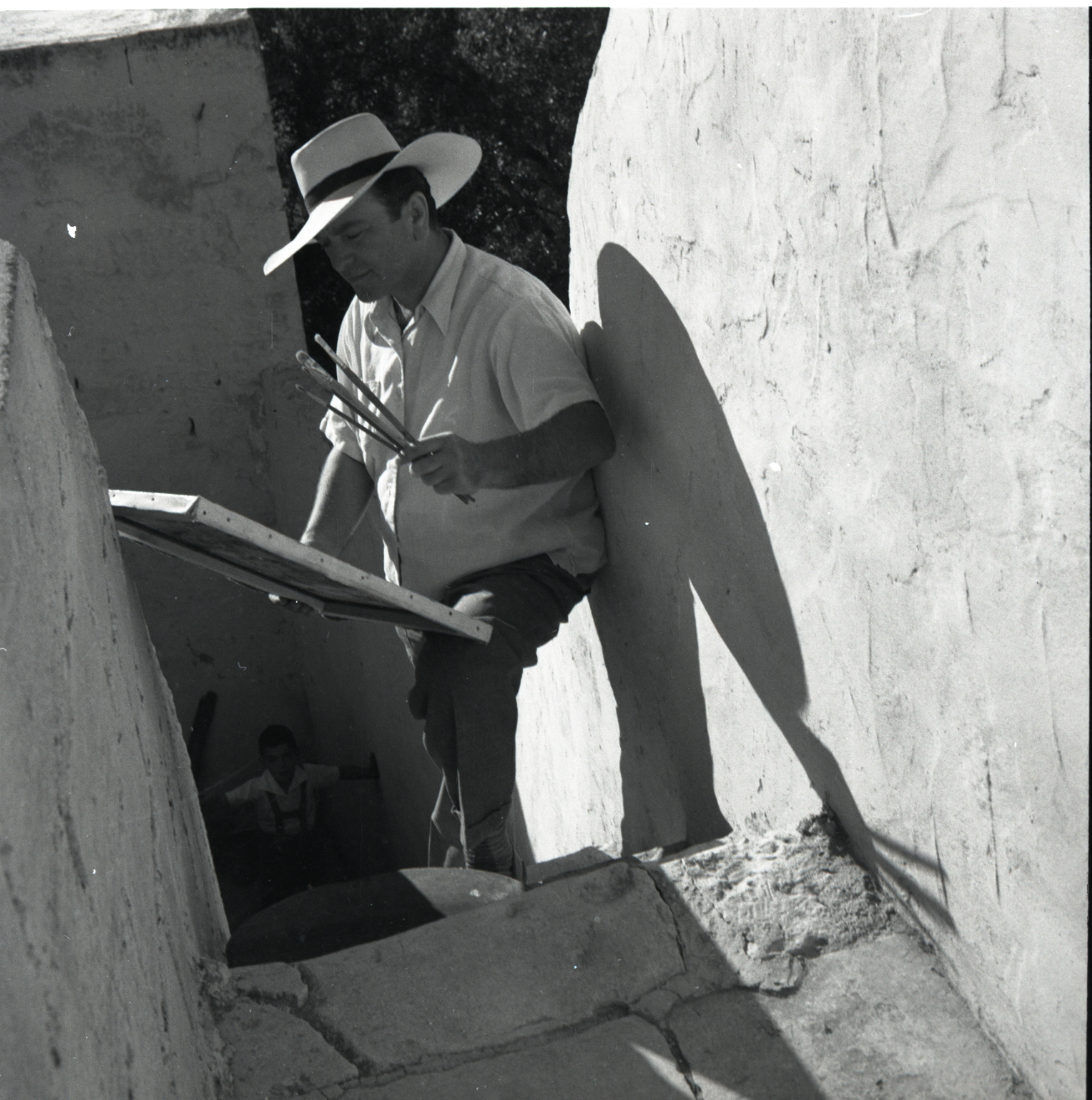
  The painter, Shimshon Holzman, in the artists' quarter of Safed
- Red Holzman (1920–1998), NBA Hall of Fame basketball player and coach
- Shimshon Holzman (born 1907), Israeli landscape and figurative painter
- Winnie Holzman (born 1954), American dramatist, screenwriter and poet
- Warren Holzman (born 1971), American artist, blacksmith and educator

See also

- David Holzman's Diary, 1967 American film, directed by Jim McBride, which spoofs the art of documentary-making
- Holzmann
