= Smart Game Format =

File format for recording board games

- Filename extension: .sgf
- Developed by: Anders Kierulf (1987, FF1), Martin Mueller (1993, FF3), Arno Hollosi (1997, FF4)
- Initial release: 1987
- Latest release: 4; 1997
- Type of format: mark up text
- Container for: Go (game) record
- Open format?: yes
- Website: red-bean.com/sgf/

The Smart Game Format (SGF) is a file format used for storing records of board games. Go is the game that is most commonly represented in this format and is the default. SGF was originally created under a different name by Anders Kierulf for his SmartGO program.

The main purposes of SGF are to store records of played games and to provide features for storing annotated and analyzed games (e.g. board markup, variations). It is a text-only, tree-based format.

Most Internet Go servers and Go software from 1990 support this format.

== About the format ==
An SGF file is composed of pairs of properties and property values, each of which describes a feature of the game. A partial list of properties appears below.

AB	Add Black: locations of Black stones to be placed on the board prior to the first move
AW	Add White: locations of White stones to be placed on the board prior to the first move.
AN	Annotations: name of the person commenting the game.
AP	Application: application that was used to create the SGF file (e.g. CGOban2,...).
B	a move by Black at the location specified by the property value.
BR	Black Rank: rank of the Black player.
BT	Black Team: name of the Black team.
C	Comment: a comment.
CP	Copyright: copyright information.
DT	Date: date of the game.
EV	Event: name of the event (e.g. 58th Honinbō Title Match).
FF	File format: version of SGF specification governing this SGF file.
GM	Game: type of game represented by this SGF file. A property value of 1 refers to Go.
GN	Game Name: name of the game record.
HA	Handicap: the number of handicap stones given to Black. Placement of the handicap stones are set using the AB property.
KM	Komi: komi.
ON	Opening: information about the opening (Fuseki), rarely used in any file.
OT	Overtime: overtime system.
PB	Black Name: name of the black player.
PC	Place: place where the game was played (e.g.: Tokyo).
PL	Player: color of player to start.
PW	White Name: name of the white player.
RE	Result: result, usually in the format "B+R" (Black wins by resign) or "B+3.5" (black wins by 3.5).
RO	Round: round (e.g.: 5th game).
RU	Rules: ruleset (e.g.: Japanese).
SO	Source: source of the SGF file.
SZ	Size: size of the board, non-square boards are supported.
TM	Time limit: time limit in seconds.
US	User: name of the person who created the SGF file.
W	a move by White at the location specified by the property value.
WR	White Rank: rank of the White player.
WT	White Team: name of the White team.

There is no strict checking of the contents of these tags, so it is possible to put any text into the result tag for example.

Variations are nested in brackets, and also usually assigned letters. The first branch (variation A) is the main branch. This notation stems from Newick format.

== Coordinate system for points and moves ==
The first letter designates the column (left to right), the second the row (top to bottom). The upper left part of the board is used for smaller boards, e.g. letters "a"-"m" for 13×13.

The author intentionally broke with the tradition of labeling moves (and points) with letters "A"-"T" (excluding "i") and numbers 1–19. Two lower-case letters in the range "a"-"s" were used instead, for reasons of simplicity and compactness.

The upper left corner as origin of the board corresponds to the way most modern computers represent screen coordinates to simplify integration of text and graphics.

== Supported games ==
Games currently supported are Amazons, Ataxx, Backgammon, Blokus, Byte, Chase, Chess, DVONN, Exxit, Focus, Gess, GIPF, Go, Gobblet, Gomoku+Renju, Hex, Hive, Hnefatafl, Jungle, Kropki, Kuba, Lines of Action, Neutron, Nine men's morris, Octi, Philosopher's Football, Plateau, PÜNCT, Quadrature, Reversi (Othello), Sahara, Shogi, TAMSK, Tantrix, Trax, Tripples, Tumbling Down, TwixT, Xiangqi, YINSH and ZÈRTZ. Although not officially supported, the sgf format is also used for Meridians. The standard specifies additional game-specific properties for Go, Backgammon, Lines of Action, Hex, Amazons, Octi, Gess, and TwixT.

== Format Versions ==
The first version of SGF, FF[1], was conceived by Anders Kierulf in 1987. It is Appendix A in his Ph.D. thesis. FF[3] was written by Martin Müller in 1993. The current version of the SGF is FF[4] by Arno Hollosi, and is supported by most current SGF readers. FF[2] was never made public. The format has been published under the Open Content License.

The fact that there is no standard designation for many properties that one might wish to represent is not really a limitation. The system is extensible, one can invent new labels, and of course that has happened already. After a while, the popular ones among the new labels become standard.

== See also ==
- Portable Game Notation – Format for recording chess games
- Portable Draughts Notation
