= GIPF =

GIPF may refer to:

- The GIPF Project, comprising seven abstract strategy board games by Kris Burm
- GIPF (game), the first and central game of the GIPF Project
- Government Institutions Pension Fund (Namibia)
