= Dungeon Mapping Sheets =

Advertisement in White Dwarf #37 for Wilderness Hex Sheets and Dungeon Mapping Sheets

Dungeon Mapping Sheets is a supplement published by Games Workshop in 1982 for use with any fantasy role-playing games .

== Contents ==
In the mid-1970s, Games Workshop became the UK distributor for the American role-playing game Dungeons & Dragons published by TSR, Inc. In 1978, GW then started to produce original licensed products for D&D, including a pad of character sheets, a pad of hex sheets, a pad of dungeon mapping sheets, and the Dungeon Floor Plans accessory which featured 1" square tiles that could be cut apart to represent rooms and corridors. Each of these products carried the Dungeons & Dragons trademark, some of the few licensed D&D products ever authorized by TSR.

In 1982, GW started to reprint some of these game aids, but this time solely as GW products, without the TSR logo. One of those rebranded products was Dungeon Floor Plans, a pad of fifty A4 sheets printed with a grid of 1" squares.

== Reception ==
Doug Cowie reviewed Dungeon Mapping Sheets for Imagine magazine, and stated that they were "well designed for the purposes for which they are intended. However, alternatives are available at less cost. The price difference must be mainly attributable to the fancy packaging: a point worth remembering before parting with your hard earned cash."
