= Wilderness Hex Sheets =

Tabletop role-playing game supplement

Advertisement in White Dwarf #37 (Jan 1983) for Dungeon Floor Plans and Wilderness Hex Sheets

Wilderness Hex Sheets is a blank hex map supplement published by Games Workshop (GW) in 1982 for use with fantasy role-playing games such as Dungeons & Dragons.

== Contents ==
In the mid-1970s, Games Workshop became the UK distributor for the American role-playing game Dungeons & Dragons published by TSR, Inc. In 1978, GW then started to produce original licensed products for D&D, including a pad of character sheets, a pad of hex sheets, and the Dungeon Floor Plans accessory, each of which carried the Dungeons & Dragons trademark. They were some of the few licensed D&D products ever authorized by TSR.

In 1982, GW started to reprint some of these game aids, but this time solely as a GW product, without the TSR logo. By this time, D&D and other fantasy role-playing games had developed the custom of using a 1"-square grid for indoor and regional maps, and a hex grid for large-scale outdoor maps. Wilderness Hex Sheets, published in 1982 as a reprint of 1978's Hex Sheets, is a pad of 50 sheets marked with a hex grid. Gamemasters can use this to design campaigns for wilderness settings, create large geographical areas or plan overland trips from one urban area to another.

== Reception ==
Doug Cowie reviewed Wilderness Hex Sheets for Imagine magazine: "They are well produced and, given the proven usefulness of these aids, they should be helpful to any referee. My only reservation is with the price. They are about 30% dearer than similar sheets available 'loose' (i.e. not in pads). The only substantial difference is the superior packaging of the Games Workshop product."

== See also ==
- Campaign Hexagon System
