= TZAAR =

2007 board game

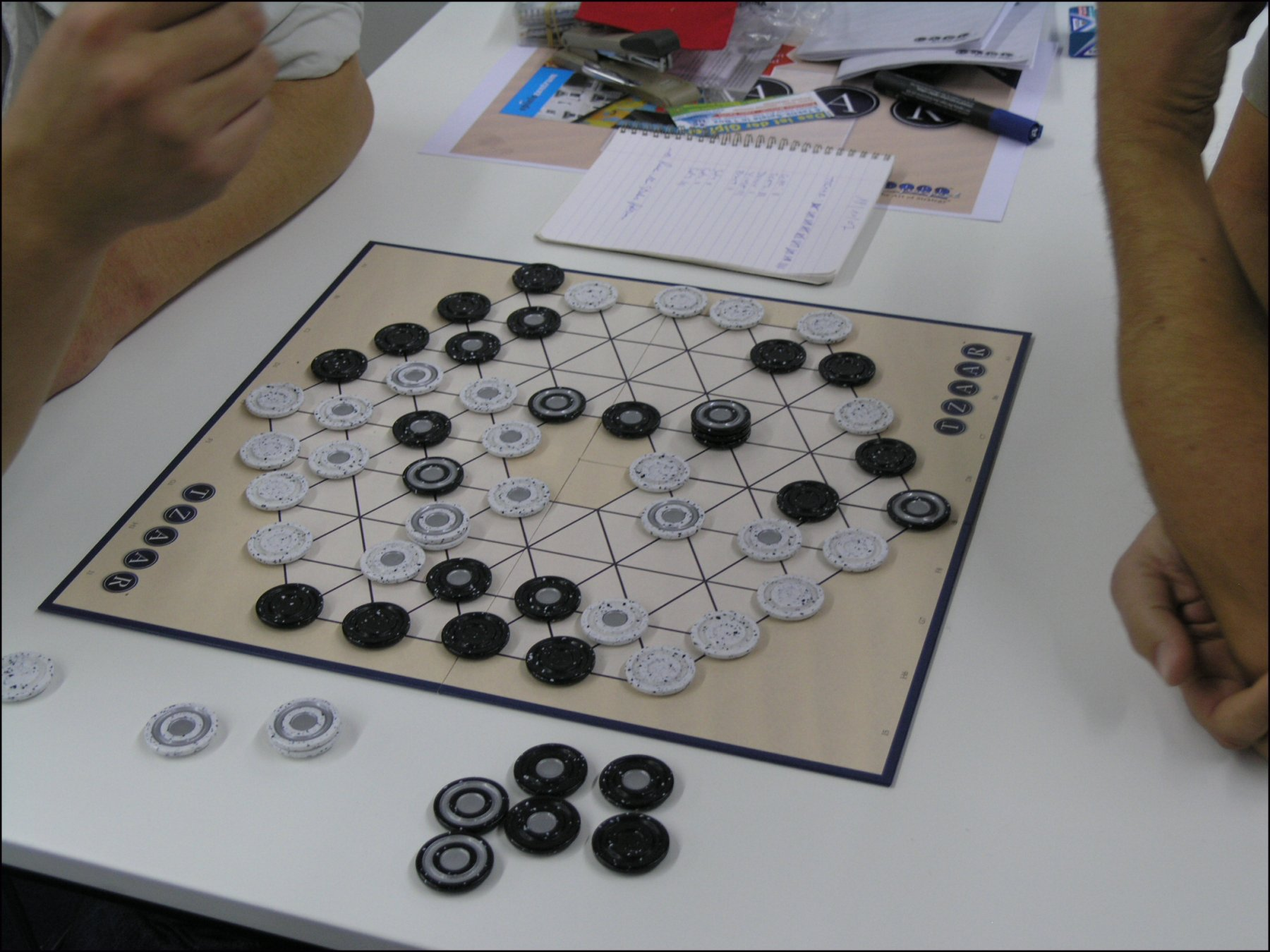
- A typical game of TZAAR
- Designers: Kris Burm
- Publishers: SmartGames
- Publication: 2007; 18 years ago
- Players: 2
- Setup time: 0 minutes
- Playing time: 30 minutes
- Chance: None
- Age range: 8 and up
- Skills: Strategic thought

TZAAR is the seventh game released in the GIPF series and Games Magazine's 2009 Game of the Year. It officially replaced TAMSK, which was originally published as the second board game in the GIPF Project.

== History ==
The game was officially released in 2008. A special limited edition (1,000 copies) pre-release version of the game (all numbered and signed copies) came for sale at the Spiel 2007 games fair in Essen, Germany.

== Rules ==
Blank hexagonal board with 60 spaces

Non-random starting position.

The game is a mix of stacking and capturing, played on a hexagonal board with a triangular grid; the 60 intersections are known as spaces. The game equipment includes 60 pieces, 30 in each color (Black and White). Each of the 30 pieces within a single color is one of 3 types: 6 tzaars, 9 tzarras, and 15 totts.

In the initial phase of the game, the players put the pieces on the board one at a time in any order they choose. As an alternative, a non-random placement may be employed instead, with each player taking three triangular wedges of the hexagonal board. The innermost ring is filled with six totts, alternating by color. The next ring is filled with 12 tzaars, again alternating color by twos. The third ring is filled with 18 tzarras, alternating by threes, and the fourth and outermost ring is filled with 24 totts, alternating by fours. Regardless of the initial setup, after the board is filled, the players draw to see which color they will play, with White making the first move.

After this, the players take turns emptying the board. Pieces move along the lines connecting each space, and a single move can extend over any number of blank spaces to the nearest piece along a line. The only legal moves are those that end on a space that is already occupied. In a capture, a player's piece moves to a space occupied by an opponent's piece. Following this move, the opponent's piece is removed from the board. Alternatively, if a player moves a piece to a space already occupied by a friendly piece, that piece is reinforced by stacking it onto the friendly piece. The reinforced stack can only be captured by another stack with equal or greater height, so a two-piece stack can be captured by a stack with two or more pieces, but not by a single piece. There is no limit to stack height.

The first turn by White is a single move to capture a Black piece. Because the board is full and has no blank spaces, the first capture by White must be of a Black piece in a space adjacent to a White piece. After the initial single capture move by White, each subsequent turn consists of each player making 2 moves: first performing a required capture of an opponent's piece; then second, either capturing another piece, reinforcing their own pieces by stacking them, or passing on their second move, ending the term immediately.

Play progresses in this manner until one of two winning conditions is met:

1. If a player loses all of one type of piece (tzaars, tzarras, or totts), they lose the game.
2. If a player is unable to capture a piece in the first part of their turn, that player loses the game.

=== Legal movement ===
Illustrative example

1. Any piece or stack can move over any number of blank spaces to another piece or stack in a straight line from the originating space.
2. A piece (or stack) cannot jump over an occupied space.
3. A piece (or stack) cannot end its move on an empty space. For example, (W)C6→C3 is the only legal move for the White stack at C6 in the example illustrated.
4. There is no blank space in the center of the board. No movement is allowed across the center of the board.
5. The first move of a turn must result in a capture. Players may not pass this first move of the turn. In the illustrated example, there are three legal captures for White: (W)C6→C3 , (W)D5→F7 , or (W)E3→C3 .

=== Capture ===
1. Any piece (or stack) may capture any other type of piece (or stack) subject to the strength based on height; there is no distinction of strength between a tzaar, tzaara, or tott.
2. A stack (or single piece) may be captured only by a stack of equal or greater strength (height). For example, while the White stack at C6 can capture the Black tzaara at C3 with (W)C6→C3 , the Black tzaara at C3 cannot capture the White stack (B)C3×C6 .

=== Stacks ===
1. When reinforcing, the piece or stack that was moved goes on top of the targeted piece or stack.
2. Any piece (stack) may reinforce any other type of piece (or stack); there is no prohibition from moving, for instance, a tott on top of a tzaar.
3. Only the single pieces and the piece on top of each stack counts when determining if all three types of pieces are still present on the game board. Because reciprocal movement is allowed (e.g., either (B)A1→C3 or (B)C3→A1 is possible as the second move of Black's turn in the illustrated example), this should be considered when determining which piece (or stack) to move on top of another stack (or piece), as (B)A1→C3 will eliminate Black's lone tzaara from play.
4. The height of a stack is unlimited, but once stacked, the stack is considered a single entity and moves as a unit.
5. Stacks of mixed color are not allowed.
