= TAMSK =

Board game

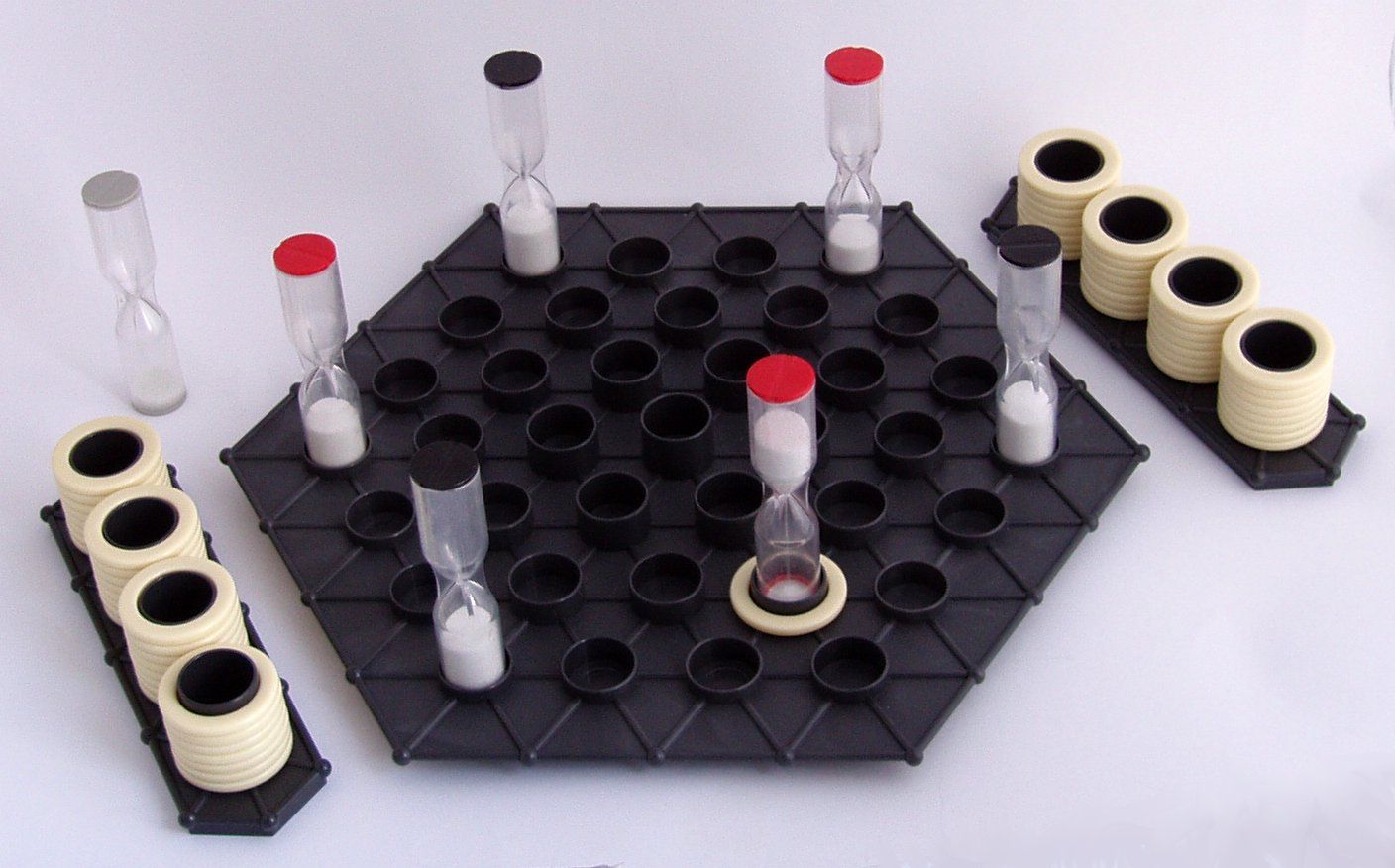
- TAMSK after a single move
- Designers: Kris Burm
- Publishers: Rio Grande Games; Don & Co. Schmidt Spiele
- Publication: 1998; 27 years ago
- Players: 2
- Setup time: 2 minutes
- Playing time: 20 minutes
- Chance: None
- Age range: 8 and up
- Skills: Strategic thought

TAMSK is a two-player board game designed by Kris Burm. It was originally published in 1998 as the second game in the GIPF Project series of abstract strategy games, although it was later dropped from the series in favor of TZAAR. Players move sand hourglass timers and drop plastic rings around spaces on a hexagonal board in an attempt to limit their opponent's moves. Each player starts the game with 32 rings, and the player with the fewest remaining rings at the end of the game is the winner. The game is unique among the GIPF Project games in having time as a central game component, and the manner in which time is used is possibly unique among board games in general.

== Rules ==
=== Equipment ===
The game board is a regular hexagon with four spaces on a side and a triangular grid with 37 playable sockets; the GIPF project games all share the triangular grid and six-sided boards.

In addition to the board, the playing equipment includes:

- 6 hourglass sand timers (3-minute), 3 in each color (black and red)
- 1 neutral hourglass timer (15-second)
- 64 identical rings, half distributed to each player
- 2 ring holders (each holds 32 rings)

The board includes sockets at each playable point that will hold an hourglass upright. The 18 sockets on the outer edge of the board has a depth that is high enough to accommodate one surrounding ring. The next rank to the inside has 12 sockets two rings high; the next rank closer to the center has 6 sockets three rings high, and the single central socket is four rings high.

=== Objective ===
Each player starts with 32 rings, and the objective is to discard as many rings as possible, so the winner is the player with the fewest remaining rings when the game ends. The game ends when neither player can make any more moves.

=== Gameplay ===
Starting position for TAMSK

To start the game, the six hourglasses must all have their upper chambers empty (e.g., sand is not running in any hourglass) and these are placed on the corners of the board in an alternating fashion by color.

Each player's turn consists of moving a timer of their color, then dropping a ring around the space to which it moved. Red takes the first turn.

=== Moving ===
A timer may be moved to an unoccupied, "unfilled" socket adjacent to its origin. The timer may not be moved to any sockets that have been "filled" with rings, which means the surrounding stack of rings are equal to the height of that socket. If the player moves to a "filled" socket, that player immediately loses the game.

When a player is unable to make a move, that player may pass on their turn until they can move again or until the game ends.

=== Dropping ===
After moving the timer, a ring may be dropped around the destination socket only (not the originating socket). If the player neglects to drop a ring around the destination, the opposing player may drop a ring around the destination socket, then proceed with their own turn. A socket is "full" when the height of the stack of rings surrounding that socket is equal to the height of the socket.

=== Example ===
Example with four player turns

Consider the illustrated example of a four-turn opening sequence:

1. (R)D1→D2 Red moves the hourglass at D1 to D2 and drops a ring
2. (B)G1→F1x Black moves an hourglass at G1 to F1 and drops a ring; the space at F1 is blocked because a single ring is sufficient to fill the perimeter sockets.
3. (R)D2→E2 Red continues to move the same hourglass and drops a ring at the destination E2. None of the
4. (B)F1→E1x From F1, Black could move to F2, G1, or E1. Black is blocked from moving to E2 because a Red hourglass occupies that socket; moving to E1 instead blocks that socket by filling it with a ring.

As this sequence continues, if Black visits D2, or Red backtracks to D2, the second ring dropped on that spot will fill that socket. The board will continue to shrink as sockets get filled.

=== Variations ===
Under the most elementary version of the game, which is known as "Level 1", the timer mechanic is not used and the hourglasses are never turned over.

As an intermediate version, "Level 2" requires both players to each move three different hourglasses for the first three turns. After the timers have been moved during each of these turns, the hourglass must be turned over, so that after both players have taken three turns, all six hourglasses are running. With each successive turn, the hourglass is turned over again, reversing the flow of sand. If an hourglass stops running, it remains on the board but cannot make any more moves. The objective in "Level 2" is the same (fewest remaining rings wins) but a tiebreaker mechanic is added: when there are an equal number of rings remaining, the player who is able to keep the last hourglass "alive" with running sand is the winner; to determine the winner, first remove the stopped hourglasses from the board, then remove and line up the remaining running hourglasses. The hourglass that stops last will determine the winner.

The advanced "Level 3" version introduces a 15-second move timer mechanic.

1. Use of the 15-second timer is optional; it does not have to be used.
2. Either player may use the 15-second timer during their opponent's move to force the opponent to complete their move or face a penalty.
3. The 15-second timer can only be turned over when the upper chamber is completely empty; a player may have to wait before using it.
4. Turns started before the 15-second timer runs out can be completed (including dropping a ring at the destination), but if the 15-second timer has expired before the turn is completed, the opponent is allowed to drop two rings on the next turn as a penalty. The first ring drops at the destination, and the second ring can be dropped on any space that is not "full" of rings, whether occupied by an hourglass or not.
5. If the turn has not started before the 15-second timer has run out, the penalty does not apply, but the player who did not start their turn forfeits that turn.

== Strategy ==
A timer must have sand running through it in order to be moved, and when it is moved, it is also turned over. Thus, rather than giving a set amount of time in which to make a move, each player's set of 3 timers all have variable amounts of time remaining in which they can be moved, and that time changes whenever a move is made. At any point during the game, it may be beneficial to delay moving or to move as quickly as possible, and an opponent can use another timer to force a move if it is in their interest. Timers that have run out cannot be moved for the remainder of the game.

Each move increasingly restricts the usable playing area of the board (a mechanic it shares with its companion games, ZÈRTZ and DVONN), which means TAMSK games move toward an inevitable conclusion in a reasonable amount of time.

== History ==
TAMSK has had fewer critical plaudits than other games in the GIPF project, and its elaborate production has meant a significantly higher retail cost, but it generated enough demand and kudos to justify a second print run.

With the 2006 release of the third set of GIPF potentials, Kris Burm announced that the GIPF project was complete, but he changed his plans in 2007 with the release of TZAAR, which replaced TAMSK as part of the GIPF series. Therefore, TAMSK is no longer on the market.
