= Dungeon Planner Set 2: Nightmare in Blackmarsh =

Cover art, 1984

Dungeon Planner Set 2: Nightmare in Blackmarsh is an adventure published by Games Workshop in 1984 for use with fantasy role-playing games.

== Contents ==
Dungeon Planner Set 2: Nightmare in Blackmarsh is a complete package for a gamemaster that includes

- an A4-sized full-colour map of the 280-square-mile region surrounding the village of Blackmarsh. Its western edge mates with the eastern edge of the map from Dungeon Planner 1: Caverns of the Dead, producing a larger map
- a large 32" x 22" full-colour map of the village of Blackmarsh
- details, history and background of Blackmarsh and environs
- important and notable people of the village
- floor plans of some of the buildings in the village
- encounter tables
- ten ideas for story hooks or adventures that could be set in this village
- a gamemaster's screen with a short history of Blackmarsh on the players' side, and useful tables on the gamemaster's side.

Unlike the previously published Dungeon Planner Set 1: Caverns of the Dead, this package does not contain a ready-made adventure.

== Publication history ==
Games Workshop had produced a licensed supplement for Dungeons & Dragons (D&D) in 1978, Dungeon Floor Plans, but generally was focused on the publication and distribution in the UK of American role-playing games. In the 2014 book Designers & Dragons: The '70s, game historian Shannon Appelcline noted that in the early 1980s, Citadel Miniatures — which been founded with start-up money from Games Workshop — was developing Warhammer Fantasy Battle for Games Workshop, a tabletop miniature wargame that would require the use of 25 mm metal miniatures and a map using a 1" square grid. In order to further promote Citadel's miniatures trade, Games Workshop started to develop role-playing products that would also use miniatures and a square-gridded map. As Appelcline relates: "A reprint of their Dungeon Floor Plans (1982) — no longer sporting the D&D logo — was the first of several gaming supplements. Three more mapping sets plus two "dungeon planners" — which included both floor plans and AD&D adventures — followed it."

Games Workshop envisioned a series of linked "Dungeon Planners", packages that would contain everything a gamemaster would need, including maps, regional information, ideas for adventures, and information about notable characters the players could meet. As the name "Dungeon Planner" suggested, the product would not be a completely detailed adventure; the gamemaster would have to spend time filling in a lot of the required details of an adventure, including planned encounters and story hooks, monsters, room furnishings, etc. Each adventure's regional map would be linked to the map of the previous product, so that as each product was released, a larger and larger "world map" would be revealed. The adventures would be "generic", not keyed to a specific role-playing system such as D&D or RuneQuest, so that any gamemaster could adapt the adventures to whatever role-playing system they were using. Because the products would use a 1" grid, gamemasters could customize or extend the dungeon floor plans using Dungeon Floor Plans products.

The first two products in this line, Dungeon Planner Set 1: Caverns of the Dead and Dungeon Planner Set 2: Nightmare in Blackmarsh, were published by Games Workshop in 1984. All writing, artwork and cartography for Dungeon Planner 2 was done by Albie Fiore and Robert Neville. As planned, the map in Dungeon Planner 2 of the region around Blackmarsh could be married to the regional map from Dungeon Planner 1, providing a much larger regional map that would eventually encompass an entire world.

However, Dungeon Planner 2 was the last product to be released in this line, as Games Workshop changed course and moved away from role-playing products to focus on Warhammer.

== Reception ==
In the December 1984 edition of White Dwarf (Issue #60), Doug Cowie admired the production values, saying, "Graphics, materials, printing — they're all first rate." He also found the map of the village "most attractive. The invitation it extends to get some figures out and start playing on it is almost irrestible." But he found the gamemaster's screen too thin to use, and pointed out that the encounter tables printed on the screen suggested that the gamemaster should take the time during the game to randomly generate encounters, rather than planning them ahead of time. However, comparing this package to Dungeon Planner 1, which was set in a dungeon, he commented "The selection of a village is a much more sensible idea... an ideal setting for referee-designed adventures but a time-consuming project for a referee to map and describe him/herself." Cowie concluded that "Dungeon Planner 2 is a much more useful product than DP1. Undoubtedly it would have made a lot more sense if it had been released first." He gave this product an average rating of 7 out of 10.
