= Burm =

Burm may refer to:

- Kris Burm (born 1957), Belgian game designer
- Burm., taxonomic author abbreviation of Johannes Burman, botanist
- Burm.f., taxonomic author abbreviation of Nicolaas Laurens Burman

== See also ==
- Berm, a landform
- Burma, former name of Myanmar
