= Abalone (board game) =

1987 board game

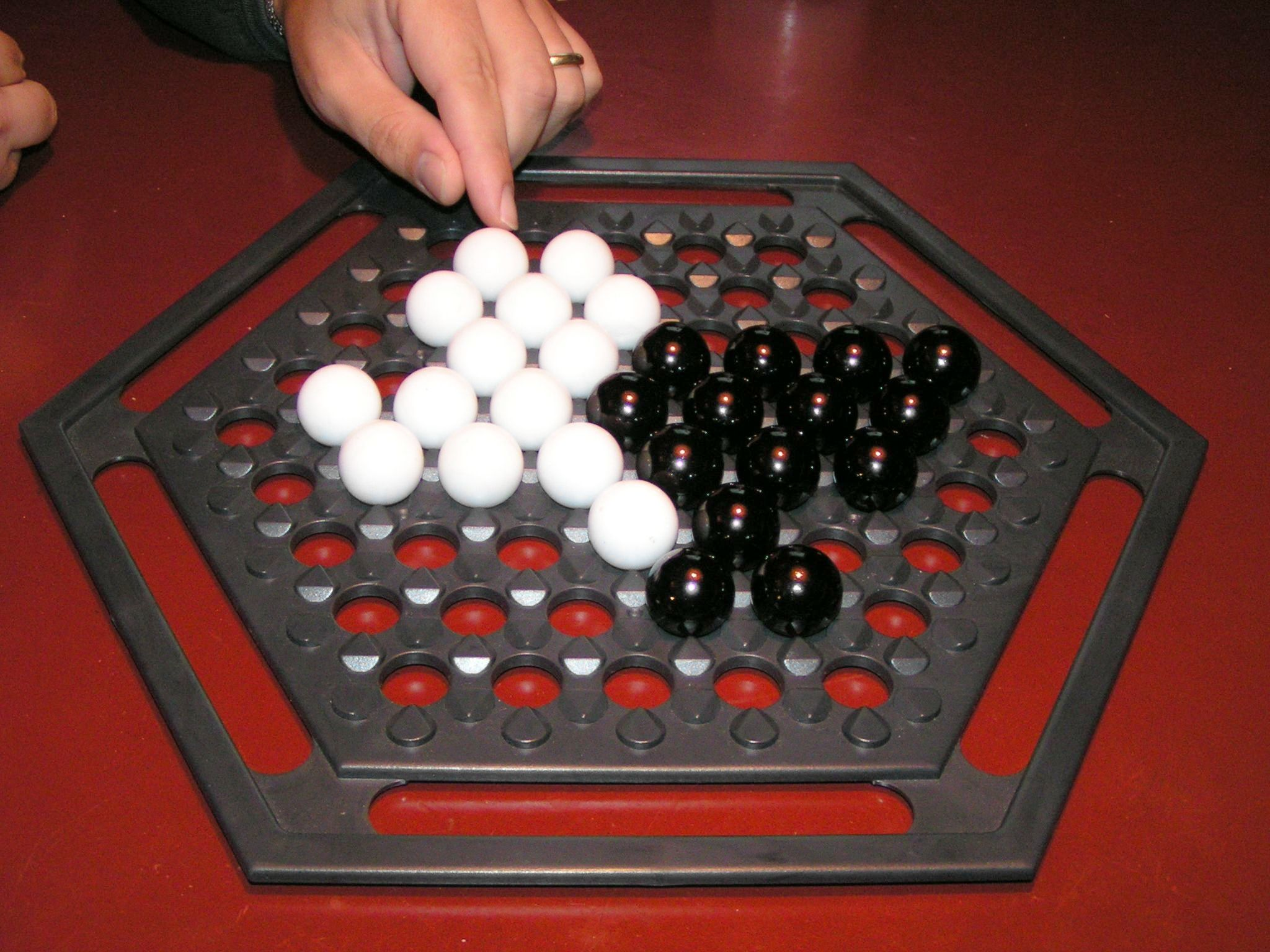
- Designers: Michel Lalet, Laurent Lévi
- Genres: Board game Abstract strategy game
- Players: 2 (or more)
- Setup time: 20–60 seconds
- Playing time: 10 minutes – 2 hours
- Chance: None
- Skills: Strategy, tactics

Abalone is a two-player abstract strategy board game designed by Michel Lalet and Laurent Lévi in 1987. Players are represented by opposing black and white marbles on a hexagonal board with the objective of pushing six of the opponent's marbles off the edge of the board.

Abalone was published in 1990 and has sold more than 4.5 million units. The year it was published it received one of the first Mensa Select awards. As of 2011, it is sold in more than thirty countries.

== Gameplay ==
=== Rules ===
The board consists of 61 circular spaces arranged in a hexagon, five on a side. Each player has 14 marbles that rest in the spaces and are initially arranged as shown below, on the left image. The players take turns with the black marbles moving first. For each move, a player moves a straight line of one, two or three marbles of one color by one space in one of six directions. The move can be either broadside / arrow-like (parallel to the line of marbles) or in-line / in a line (serial in respect to the line of marbles), as illustrated below.

Initial position

Black opens with a broadside move.

White counters with an in-line move.

A player can push their opponent's marbles (a "sumito") that are in a line to their own with an in-line move only. They can only push if the pushing line has more marbles than the pushed line (three can push one or two; two can push one). Marbles must be pushed to an empty space (i.e. not blocked by a marble) or off the board. The winner is the first player to push six of the opponent's marbles off the edge of the board.

=== Move notation ===
The notation for recording moves assigns the letters a-i (or A-I) to the horizontal lines, and the numbers 1–9 to southeast–northwest diagonals.

     i O O O O O
    h O O O O O O
   g · · O O O · ·
  f · · · · · · · ·
 e · · · · · · · · · 
  d · · · · · · · · 9
   c · · @ @ @ · · 8
    b @ @ @ @ @ @ 7
     a @ @ @ @ @ 6
        1 2 3 4 5

There are several popular notations for the moves.

- Aba-Pro notation
  - In-line move: fromFirst toFirst, e.g. e5f6, in the picture below, denotes moving the marbles at {e5, f6, g7} to {f6, g7, h8} (while pushing {h8} to {i9} and ejecting i9), c3b2 is {c3, b2} to {b2, a1}, ejecting {a1}.
  - Broadside move: fromFirst fromLast toFirst, e.g. e5g7f5 (or g7e5h7: each broadside move has two distinct notations; the unicity can be forced by adding the constraint used in Nacre, thereby only allowing e5g7f5) denotes moving the marbles at {e5, f6, g7} to {f5, g6, h7}.
- Nacre notation
  - All moves: fromFirst toLast, only considering the friendly marbles displaced, such that the distance between the two coordinates equal the number of friendly marbles moved minus one; e.g. e5f6 in Aba-Pro becomes e5h8, e5g7f5 becomes e5h7, c3b2 becomes c3a1. The distance used is defined by the following norm: $\|(x, y)\| = \frac{|x| + |y| + |x - y|}{2}$. The constraint on the distance ensures there is a unique notation for each move. Notice the notation for a two-marble broadside move can always represent two different moves, but both are never legal at the same time; e.g. d1e3 can mean {d1, d2} to {e2, e3}, or {d1, e2} to {d2, e3}.
- Extended Nacre notation
  - All moves: the same as Nacre, except that opponent marbles moved are taken into account (therefore it only differs from Nacre for in-line moves). Requires additional coordinate labels when a marble is ejected: e.g. e5h8 in Nacre becomes e5j10 (i9 is pushed to j10), c3a1 becomes c300 (a1 is pushed to 00). This notation has the advantage, compared to Aba-Pro and Nacre, of being reversible: from the final position and the moves leading to it, one can deduce the initial position.
- PlayStrategy notation
  - All moves: the same as extended Nacre, except that an in-line move featuring an ejection sees its second coordinate replaced by the coordinate of the departure of the ejected marble (rather than its destination), preceded by a symbol of ejection, avoiding the use of additional coordinates; e.g., e5j10 in extended Nacre becomes e5×i9, c300 becomes c3×a1.

     i @ · · · O                   i — @ · · O
    h @ · · · O ·                 h — @ · · @ ·
   g @ · · · @ · ·               g — @ · · @ · ·
  f · · · · @ · · ·             f · · · · @ · · ·
 e · · · · @ · @ @ ·     ->    e · @ @ · / · — @ @
  d @ @ · · · · · · 9           d / / · · · · O · 9
   c · · @ · · O · 8             c · · / · · @ · 8
    b · @ · · @ · 7               b · @ · · @ · 7
     a O · · @ · 6                 a @ · · / · 6
        1 2 3 4 5                     1 2 3 4 5

    AP. e7e8  a4b5  e5f6   c3b2  d1d2e2  g3i5g4
    N.  e7e9  a4c6  e5h8   c3a1   d1e3    g3i6
    EN. e7e9  a4d7  e5j10  c300   d1e3    g3i6
    PS. e7e9  a4d7  e5×i9  c3×a1  d1e3    g3i6

=== Avoiding draws ===
The dynamics of the basic game may have one serious flaw: it seems that a good but conservative player can set up their marbles in a defensive wedge and ward off all attacks indefinitely. An attacker may try to outflank this wedge or lure it into traps, but such advances are often more dangerous to the attacker than the defender. Thus, from the starting position, it takes little skill and no imagination to avoid losing, and nothing in the rules prevents games from being interminable.

Because it is boring for games to be drawn out indefinitely, serious Abalone players tacitly agree to play aggressively. A player who forms a defensive wedge and makes no attempt to attack is likely to be a novice who might lose anyway. Nevertheless, there remains the possibility of any competent player bringing the game to a standstill and successfully avoiding losing, even to a championship-level player.

There are several possible "solutions". First, in tournaments, a judge may penalize a player for playing defensively. This solution is somewhat unsatisfactory, given that a judge may not always be present, and that "defensive play" is subjective.

Second, several variations of the rules have been developed for the same board and marbles.

The third, and perhaps best, alternative starting positions have been designed to make the formation of stalemate wedges less likely. Experiments are still underway to find an opening position which neither devolves to a draw nor gives too great an advantage to the first player. One popular attempt are the Marguerite or Daisy positions, two versions of which are displayed in the center and to the right.

Another option is to create a "turn limit" where if no marble has been knocked off the board by turn 15, whoever has made the most progress towards the center line wins. This encourages an aggressive strategy of moving forward, and often the rule will not come into play.

Black can defend forever.

German daisy starting position

Belgian daisy starting position

=== Rule variations and more players ===
Abalone can be played by three or more people using the same board with fewer marbles for each player and each player using a different colour, the players being possibly gathered into teams.

A number of two-player variations use a third colour for passive pieces: for example, the variation called The Pillar (with a fixed marble in the centre of the board), which has been examined in some depth by Alex Borello and Nicolas Le Gal. Another possible variation involves either player winning the game by ejecting the central marble.

A few variations use a second layer of marbles.

Grand Abalone is a variation featuring a larger board (6 cells per side), wherein the players are granted two moves per turn (except for the very first turn of the game, to mitigate the advantage of playing first). The players may move 4 of their marbles instead of 3, and must achieve a score of 10 ejections to win, instead of 6.

Belgian daisy starting position for Grand Abalone

== Strategy ==
Forums of Abalone communities have found that, generally:

- Keep the marbles close to the centre of the board and force the opponent to move to the edges.
- Keep the marbles close together for increased defense and attack, especially in a hexagon shape to be able to push or defend in any direction.
- Pushing the opponent off the board is not usually a good idea if it leads to weaknesses in the player's geometry.
- Setting a "trap" by making a marble weak in one direction allows for opponent to weaken center defenses.

== Champions ==
Person-to-person competitions have been held by the Mind Sports Olympiad since 1997.

- 1997: Marc Tastet
- 1998: Vojtěch Hrabal
- 1999: Gert Schnider
- 2000: Gert Schnider
- 2001: Thomas Fenner
- 2002: Jan Šťastna
- 2003: Stephane Nicolet
- 2004: Alex Borello
- 2005: David M. Pearce
- 2006: Jan Šťastna
- 2007: Vincent Frochot
- 2008: Jan Šťastna
- 2009: David M. Pearce
- 2010: Vincent Frochot
- 2011: Vincent Frochot
- 2012: David M. Pearce
- 2013: David M. Pearce
- 2014: Nicolas Fiorini
- 2015: Vincent Frochot
- 2016: Vincent Frochot
- 2017: Vincent Frochot
- 2018: Vincent Frochot
- 2019: Vincent Frochot
- 2020: Alex Borello
- 2021: Alex Borello
- 2022: Vincent Frochot
- 2023: Vincent Frochot
- 2024: Kang Kyungmin
- 2025: David M. Pearce
- 2026: Vincent Frochot

Gert Schnider and Thomas Fenner participated in the evaluation and adjustment of Aba-Pro. Marc Tastet was the 1992 World Othello Champion, Stephane Nicolet is a two-time World Othello Championship finalist, and Jan Stastna is a strong Othello player.

In a computer-to-computer competition held in 2003 at the International Computer Games Association (ICGA) events in Graz, Austria, the Aba-Pro program defeated the Nacre program.

In 1999, a number of top players from the Mind Sports Olympiad signed an agreement to use a different starting position (the Belgian daisy) to revitalize the game. This has been used for top tournaments since then, including the AbaCup.

== Reception ==
In the February–March 1990 edition of Games International (Issue 13), Mike Siggins called the components "of good quality", and the rules "extremely concise." He found the game very replayable, and commented that "it has the potential to become a classic." His only complaint was that "as players become more proficient the game can slow up and stalemates often result." Despite this, Siggins gave the game an above-average rating of 8 out of 10, saying, "Abalone is one of the best abstract games to appear in a long while."

A player commenting for the Los Angeles Times said that "If you really like strategic problems with tactical subtleties, Abalone's the game [...] And played at the deeper levels, sometimes it's so complex it's really baffling."

== Play online ==
Several digital adaptions of Abalone are available:

- Board Game Arena - browser-based multiplayer version.
- PlayAbalone - free browser-based version with AI opponents.
- PlayStrategy - free browser-based version, with real-time and turn-based play; features standard Abalone and Grand Abalone.
- Steam - digital edition with local and online play.

== Reviews ==
- Games #98
- Jeux & Stratégie #54

== See also ==
- GIPF project, a series of other abstract board games using hexagons
  - DVONN
  - ZÈRTZ
  - YINSH
