= Dungeon Planner Set 1: Caverns of the Dead =

Cover art, 1984

Dungeon Planner Set 1: Caverns of the Dead is an adventure published by Games Workshop in 1984 for use with fantasy role-playing games.

== Contents ==
Dungeon Planner Set 1: Caverns of the Dead is a complete package for a gamemaster that includes

- an A4-sized map of a region called "Eastern Koss"
- details, history and background of Eastern Koss
- a role-playing adventure that takes players into "The Royal Tombs"
- a large map A3-sized floor plan of the Royal Tombs, marked with a 1" square grid
- encounter tables
- eight ideas for story hooks
- how this adventure could be converted from a role-playing adventure to a Warhammer wargame
- a gamemaster's screen with a short history of Eastern Koss on the players' side, and useful tables on the gamemaster's side.

== Publication history ==
Games Workshop had produced a licensed supplement for Dungeons & Dragons (D&D) in 1978, Dungeon Floor Plans, but generally was focused on the licensed publication and distribution in the UK of American role-playing games. In the 2014 book Designers & Dragons: The '70s, game historian Shannon Appelcline noted that in the early 1980s, Citadel Miniatures — which been founded with start-up money from Games Workshop — was developing Warhammer Fantasy Battle for Games Workshop, a tabletop miniature wargame that would require the use of 25 mm metal miniatures and a map using a 1" square grid. In order to further promote Citadel's miniatures trade, Games Workshop started to develop role-playing products that would also use miniatures and a square-gridded map. As Appelcline relates: "A reprint of their Dungeon Floor Plans (1982) — no longer sporting the D&D logo — was the first of several gaming supplements. Three more mapping sets plus two "dungeon planners" — which included both floor plans and AD&D adventures — followed it."

Games Workshop envisioned a series of linked "Dungeon Planners", packages that would contain everything a gamemaster would need, including maps, regional information, and a role-playing adventure. As the name "Dungeon Planner" suggested, the product would not be a completely detailed adventure; the gamemaster would have to spend time filling in a lot of the required details of monsters, room furnishings, etc. Each adventure's regional map would be linked to the map of the previous product, so that as each product was released, a larger and larger "world map" would be created. The adventures would be "generic", not keyed to a specific role-playing system such as D&D or RuneQuest, so that any gamemaster could adapt the adventures to whatever role-playing system they were using. Because the products would use a 1" grid, gamemasters could customize or extend the dungeon floor plans using Dungeon Floor Plans products. The package also included information about how the adventure and maps could be adapted for use as a Warhammer wargame combat.

The first product in this line, Dungeon Planner Set 1: Caverns of the Dead, was written by Albie Fiore and Robert Neville, with artwork by Fiore and Neville as well as Gary Chalk. It was published by Games Workshop in 1984 as a boxed set.

The following year, Games Workshop released the sequel, Dungeon Planner Set 2: Nightmare in Blackmarsh. However, no further products in this line were ever published, as Games Workshop moved away from role-playing products to focus on Warhammer.

== Reception ==
In the May 1984 edition of White Dwarf (Issue 53), Richard Meadows noted that although the adventure was supposedly suitable for any role-playing system, "the monsters used in the text are undeniably AD&D style monsters." Meadows liked the production values, saying, "The product is colourful and attractively boxed... The map itself is very nicely drawn, and has a good fantasy 'feel' to it." He noted that unlike the highly detailed D&D adventures published by TSR, the details of this adventure were only sketched in: "Plenty of space is left for the DM to add the necessary details which will bring the descriptions of the rooms to life by supplying active inhabitants and other trappings (which will also mean that each adventure into the tombs can be different, exciting and used for more than one scenario.)" Meadows concluded by giving Dungeon Planner 1 an average rating of 7 out of 10, saying, "Compared to a D&D module, Caverns of the Dead may seem poor value for money. However, it is a useful way to help players design their own dungeon adventures, and provides useful foundations of a world background for the DM to develop."

Doug Cowie reviewed Caverns of the Dead for Imagine magazine, and stated that "Caverns of the Dead is, in essence, the Play Sheet. The rest is scaffolding designed to make it stand up as a viable RPG accessory. Conclusion : you are better off buying a box of Games Workshop's splendid Dungeon Floor Plans (you can almost afford two sets for the price of CoD) and designing your own games. You won't have much more work to do and you will have lots more scope."
