= Hoppers (game) =

Peg solitaire game released by ThinkFun

Hoppers (ages 8+) is a classic Peg solitaire game released by ThinkFun in 1999. Players set up the board according to the pictures on each challenge card, then "leap frog" all the green frogs until only the red frog remains.

The game was created by Nob Yoshigahara, and is based on the classic Peg Solitaire game “The Great Thirteen” which was patented on July 15 by the inventor W.C. Breitenbach Yoshigahara also developed a computer program to develop a wide range of challenges for the game.

Hoppers Jr. (Ages 5–7) is also sold by ThinkFun. It has a larger board, fewer frogs and easier puzzles than the original.

== Awards ==
Hoppers Awards:

- Oppenheim Toy Portfolio: Gold Award-2001
- Oppenheim Toy Portfolio: Gold Award-2000
- Parents’ Choice: Silver Honor Award-1999
- Dr. Toy: 100 Best Children’s Products-1999
- Dr. Toy: 10 Best Games-1999
- Parent’s Guide to Children’s Media: Children’s Media Program Award-1999

Hoppers Jr Awards:

- iParenting Media 2008 Greatest Products Award
