= ThinkFun =

Toy and board game company

Coordinates: 38°48′11.6″N 77°3′36.5″W

- Formerly: Binary Arts (1985–2003)
- Founded: 1985; 41 years ago in Virginia
- Founder: Bill Ritchie; Andrea Barthello
- Headquarters: 1725 Jamieson Avenue, Alexandria, Virginia, United States
- Parent: Ravensburger
- Website: www.thinkfun.com

ThinkFun, formerly known as Binary Arts, is a toy and board game company founded in 1985 by Bill Ritchie and Andrea Barthello. The two started the company from the basement of their home in Virginia, with a product base that initially consisted of four games invented by a family friend William Keister (Spin-out, The Cat, The Horse, and Hexadecimal Puzzle). The husband and wife team used these products as a launching pad for their company, and within six months they were able to move the company headquarters out of their basement and into a more workable space and were able to begin to expand their product line.

== History ==
ThinkFun was founded in 1985 in the basement of husband-and-wife team Bill Ritchie and Andrea Barthello, with the mission "To translate the brilliant ideas of the craziest mathematicians, engineers and inventors into simple toys that can be appreciated by boys and girls around the world."

The 1980s were a difficult time in the toy industry. Retailers were moving away from games, and the Rubik's Cube, which had broken through in the mass market, was losing popularity. In 1990 the retail market transformed and the number of shopping malls began to increase rapidly. Retail-lifestyle stores looking for specialty products discovered ThinkFun's games and the company grew. From 1992 to 1994, ThinkFun was listed on Inc 500's fastest-growing companies list (#299 in 1992, #261 in 1993 and #396 in 1994).

In 1996, ThinkFun released its most successful game to date: Rush Hour. Rush Hour, invented by Nob Yoshigahara, is a traffic jam–themed board game with 40 puzzles varying in difficulty. As a result, the company grew to do business internationally. ThinkFun has relied on a network of the world's premier inventors, including Yoshigahara and Scott Kim, among others, to continue to develop their product line.

ThinkFun has focused much of their attention on early learning products geared towards the education of young children with games such as Zingo, What's Gnu, Snack Attack, and S'Match! In 2012, ThinkFun introduced Roll & Play, a game for toddlers.

ThinkFun was one of the first toy companies to move into the app market, and versions of its Rush Hour, Solitaire Chess, and Chocolate Fix games were launched on the iPhone, iPod touch, and Android.

In 2017, ThinkFun was acquired by Ravensburger.

== Cognitive research ==
ThinkFun has encouraged formal research into problem-solving instruction and brain training. The company partnered with the Bunge Cognitive Control and Development Lab at UC Berkeley, who have used brain imaging to measure the effects of gameplay on reasoning ability. In an initial study, Dr. Silvia Bunge and her team of researchers found that elementary students who played games, including ThinkFun's Rush Hour and Chocolate Fix, for a total of 20 hours over an 8-week period demonstrated an average increase of 13 points on a measure of performance IQ. ThinkFun and the Bunge Lab later planned a large-scale study that would use fMRI technology to measure the effects of gameplay on the brain.

== Core products ==
- Rush Hour
- Zingo!
- Gravity Maze
- MathDice & MathDice Jr.
- Chocolate Fix
- Swish
- River Crossing – The perilous plank puzzle
- Roll & Play
- Solitaire Chess
- Distraction
- Tipover
- PathWords & PathWords Jr.
- 36 Cube
- Hoppers

== See also ==
- SmartGames
