= Zingo! =

Bingo-like game

Zingo! is a game inspired by Bingo released by ThinkFun in 2002.

Players try to fill their Zingo! cards with matching tiles from the Zingo! "Zinger". In the game, the dealer slides the Zinger to reveal two tiles at a time. When a player sees a tile that matches a picture on his/her board, he/she calls out the name of the object and places that tile on the matching space on their board. If two players have that tile, the person who calls out the name of the object first gets the tile. The first player to fill his/her card wins. The green sides have less images in common with the other 7 boards, while the red sides have many of the same images.

== Game variations ==
- Mini-Zingo – The first player to get three pictures in a row is a winner
- Zany Zingo – Select 100
- Pattern to Match (square, X, cross, etc.) and the first to complete this shape is the winner.
- Multi-Card Zingo – Players use one or more cards, and the first player to fill one of his/her cards is a winner.

Zingo is also available in Spanish/English, French/English, German/English and Hebrew/English versions.

== Reception ==
The San Francisco Chronicle reviewed the game and said, "It's bingo on caffeine, basically, but without the support hose. Players try to fill their cards with matching picture tiles from the 'zinger.' Kids like the competition, naturally, but there also is an educational component. Zingo promises to teach shape recognition and short-term-memory skills in kids."

=== Awards ===
- T.O.T.Y. Nominee – Game of the Year Category – 2008
- TDmonthly Classic Award – 2008
- ASTRA Best Toys for Kids List – 2008
- T.O.T.Y Nominee – Specialty Toy of the Year Category – 2007
- The iParenting Media "Hottest Products of 2004" Award – 2004
- Grandparents Magazine Top 10 Gifts for Children 8 and Under – 2003
- Grandparents Magazine Top Games – 2003
- Learning Magazine Teachers' Choice SM Award – 2003
- Great American Toy Test Top 18 Toys of the Year −2002
- Oppenheim Toy Portfolio Gold Seal Award −2002
- Parents' Choice Award – 2002
- Canadian Toy Testing Council Three Star Award – 2003
- National Parenting Center – Seal of Approval −2002
- EdutainingKids.com Holiday Gift Guide – 2002
- iGrandparents.com Holiday Bets – Best Board Game – 8 and Under – 2002
- DallasChild Magazine Toy Test – Best Board Game – 2002
- Parents' Choice Holiday List – 2002
