= Hexagonal and Grid Mapping System =

1981 role-playing game supplement

Hexagonal and Grid Mapping System is a 1981 role-playing game blank hex map supplement published by The Companions.

== Contents ==
Hexagonal and Grid Mapping System is a package of 50 one-sided letter-sized hex sheets for game mapping, stored in a wrap-around folder.

== Reception ==
Lewis Pulsipher reviewed Hexagonal and Grid Mapping System in The Space Gamer No. 50. Pulsipher commented that "This is an impressive product. If you want to hex-map large areas of a role-playing world, I know of no better aid."

== See also ==
- Hex Sheets
