= GIPF (game) =

Abstract strategy board game

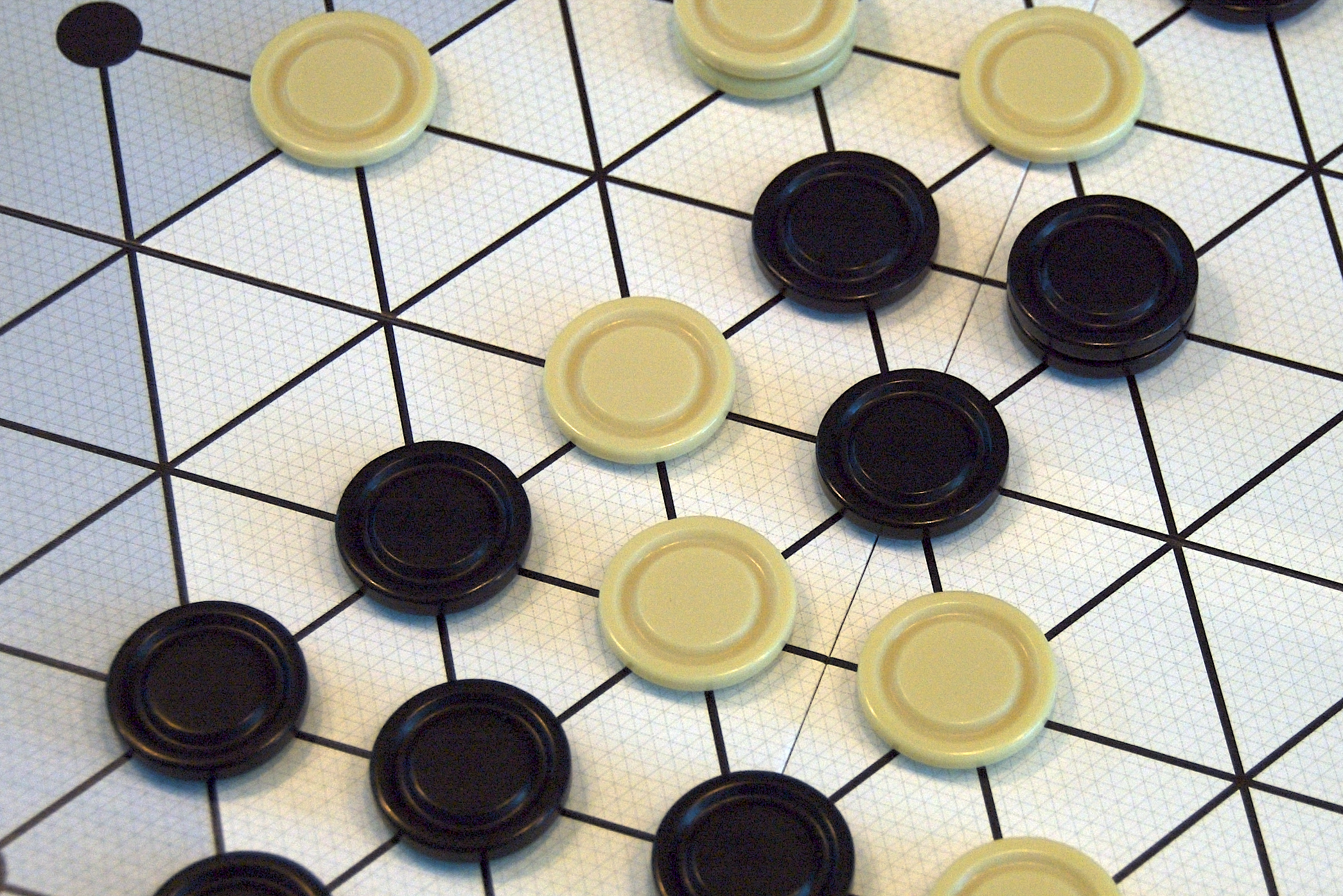
- Close-up of a game in play
- Designers: Kris Burm
- Publishers: Rio Grande Games; Don & Co.; Schmidt Spiele; SMART Games
- Publication: 1996; 30 years ago
- Genres: Board game; Abstract strategy game
- Players: 2
- Setup time: 2 minutes
- Playing time: 30 minutes
- Chance: None
- Skills: Strategy, tactics

GIPF is an abstract strategy board game by Kris Burm, the first of seven games in his series of games called the GIPF Project. GIPF was recommended by Spiel des Jahres in 1998.

== Rules ==
GIPF game board and starting position

The game board has a hexagonal shape with 4 intersection points per side and 37 intersections altogether, connected by a triangular grid. The playing area is surrounded by an array of 24 dots that are used to introduce pieces into play.

To start, players deploy three pieces each, alternating colors, at the corners of the playing area, and turn the board so that a corner with the player's color is closest to them. In the starting position shown here, the White player is seated at the bottom of the board while the Black player is at the top. White takes the first turn. There are 18 pieces of each color; the basic game uses 15 (or more) while the standard and tournament games use all 18 for each player.

=== Placing and pushing ===
In each turn, players introduce a piece onto the board from one of the surrounding dots, then push the new piece into the playing area along a line connected to the dot. When a piece is pushed onto the playing area, any pieces ahead of it are pushed ahead along the same line as well. There are several restrictions on this movement:

1. The "push" moves pieces only one space/node at a time.
2. An intermediate free space/node interrupts the "push" and any piece(s) beyond the free space/node do not move.
3. The "push" cannot move a piece out of the playing area. That is, if the chosen line is already "full" and has pieces all the way to the opposite end of the playing field, then that direction is blocked and the piece cannot be pushed.
(1a) White opens by introducing a piece on the dot at B1 ...

(1b) ... and pushes the piece up to B2 from the dot (W)B1→B2 , displacing the Black piece at B2 to B3 as shown

(2) Black counters by introducing a piece on B6, then pushes it down to B5 (B)B6→B5 , displacing the White piece to B4.

(3a) White introduces another piece on B1 again, but now is blocked from pushing to B2 (W)B1×B2 , since that would push the Black piece at B5 out of play. The only legal push from B1 now is to C2 (W)B1→C2 as shown by the solid arrow.

(3b) White could have introduced the piece on A2 instead, then pushed to B2 (W)A2→B2 , with the same result. However, placing on A2 opens up the option to push to B3 instead (W)A2→B3 , displacing the black piece to C4.

=== Basic 4-in-a-row mechanic ===
In the most basic form of the game, each player has a reserve inventory of 12 pieces in addition to the 3 on the board for the starting position. To extend the length of the game, each player could add one, two, or three extra pieces to their reserves; alternatively, as a handicap, the less-experienced player could be given up to three extra pieces in their reserve.

Forming a continuous line of four pieces in the player's color results in three actions:

1. All of the pieces (friendly and opposing) in the line contiguous with the 4-in-a-row are removed from the board.
2. The friendly pieces in the contiguous line are returned to the player's reserves.
3. Any opposing pieces in the contiguous line are captured and no longer available to the opposing player.
(ex.1) Black places on B1 and pushes to C2 (B)B1→C2 , creating a line of four Black pieces in a row at E4-F5-G6-H7. In this case, the entire line from C2 to H7 is taken off the board. The five Black pieces are returned to the Black player's reserves and the single White piece is captured by Black.

(ex.2) Same move (B)B1→C2 and resulting four-in-a-row at E4-F5-G6-H7 removes the line from C2 to H7. In this case, a second White four-in-a-row is formed B3-C3-D3-E3. However, since it was Black's turn, Black chooses to take the line from C2 to H7 off the board (four Black to reserve, one White captured), eliminating the White line by removing the piece at D3, and White does not capture the Black piece at F3.

(ex.3) Same move (B)B1→C2 and resulting four-in-a-row at E4-F5-G6-H7 removes the line from C2 to H7. In this case, a second, intersecting Black four-in-a-row is formed D4-E4-F4-G4. Black will choose to remove either (C2 ... H7) or (B4 ... G4) but not both! (C2 ... H7) returns five to reserves and captures one White piece, while (B4 ... G4) returns four and captures two.
- When two groups of four in a row are created simultaneously:
  - If the groups do not intersect, both are captured.
  - If the groups do intersect, the player of that color may choose which group to take.
  - If both players must take pieces, the player who placed and pushed chooses first.

Once one player runs out of pieces in their reserve, the other player is the winner.

=== Standard game ===
Starting position (standard rules) with double-stacked GIPF pieces at each corner

The standard game follows the basic rules but includes GIPF pieces, which are each two stacked pieces. The starting position is the same, but all six pieces on the board to start are double-stacked GIPF pieces. Each player still starts with 18 basic (single) pieces, but the revised starting position with six GIPF pieces means each player's reserves start with 12 basic pieces.

The basic pushing and 4-in-a-row mechanics remain the same, with the following exceptions:

1. Only basic pieces can be introduced and pushed onto the board. No new GIPF pieces can be created.
2. When a GIPF piece is in a line to be removed from the board, the player who is removing the line can choose whether or not to leave the GIPF piece on the board. Because the winning condition requires at least one GIPF piece of the player's color to remain on the board, it is generally advantageous to remove the opponent's GIPF pieces.
3. When two 4-in-a-row groups intersect, and the GIPF piece is at the point of intersection, the player may choose to remove one or both lines. In either case, the player also may choose to keep the GIPF piece on the board or remove it with either line.
4. If a GIPF piece of the player's color is returned to the reserve, it is separated and returned as two basic pieces.

As in the basic game, exhausting the opponent's reserves is one winning condition. The other is eliminating all of the opponent's GIPF pieces.

=== Tournaments ===
As a suggestion, in tournament play, the following modified rules can be used:

1. The board is started without any pieces.
2. Each player's first move shall introduce and push a GIPF piece onto the board.
3. An unlimited number of GIPF pieces can be introduced, if desired, on the player's second and subsequent turns. However, once a single piece has been introduced, that player may not introduce any more GIPF pieces.

== Gameplay and strategy ==
Players take turns pushing tokens (one player taking black, the other white) from the edge of the tri-gridded, hexagonal board, with pieces already in play pushed in front of the new placements rather than allowing more than one piece on any space.

The game is lost if a player has no more tokens to play, and since each starts with a set number of tokens, it is clearly necessary to recycle pieces already positioned to keep playing. This is achieved by contriving to line up four pieces of the same colour in a row on the board, at which point those tokens are returned to their owner, and any opposing tokens extending from the line of four are captured.

Because a single player will often move several pieces and change numerous on-board relationships, it is remarkably difficult to predict the state of the board more than one turn ahead, despite GIPF being a game of perfect information. Play tends to be highly fluid and there is no real concept of long term territorial or spatial development.

The game can be expanded with extra pieces (available separately) called Potentials, which allow different kinds of moves to be made. These are named for the other games in the GIPF Project, though the other games are not actually necessary in order to utilise the Potentials named after them.

== See also ==
- Hex map
- Abalone (board game)
