= Hex Sheets =

1978 role-playing game supplement

- Cover
- Genre: Role-playing game
- Publisher: Games Workshop
- Media type: Print

Hex Sheets is a blank hex map supplement for fantasy role-playing games published by Games Workshop in 1978.

== Contents ==
Hex Sheets is a pad of hexagonal mapping paper designed to aid the gamemaster in producing wilderness terrain for adventure. It is also intended for use with Advanced Dungeons & Dragons.

== Publication history ==
Hex Sheets was published by Games Workshop in 1978 as a 50-sheet pad.

Shannon Appelcline explained that by the late 1970s, Games Workshop "expanded its publishing arm beyond White Dwarf and reprints of American products. Among their first original products were a pad of character sheets (1978), a pad of hex sheets (1978), and the Dungeon Floor Plans (1979) gaming accessory, each of which carried the Dungeons & Dragons trademark; they were some of the few licensed D&D products ever authorized by TSR."

Games Workshop later produced a set of Wilderness Hex Sheets in 1982, as a pad containing 50 A4 paper sheets printed with 6 mm hexes.

== Reception ==
Doug Cowie reviewed Wilderness Hex Sheets for Imagine magazine, and stated that "They are well produced and, given the proven usefulness of these aids, they should be helpful to any referee. My only reservation is with the price. They are about 30% dearer than similar sheets available 'loose' (i.e. not in pads). The only substantial difference is the superior packaging of the Games Workshop product."

== See also ==
- Hexagonal and Grid Mapping System
