= Chase (board game) =

Board game

Chase is a board game designed by Tom Kruszewski and published by TSR in 1985.

== Description ==
Chase is a two-player abstract boardgame. The components are:

- 20 six-sided dice (10 red, 10 blue)
- board with a 9x9 hexagonal grid
- rulebook

=== Set-up ===
Each player places 9 of their dice on the end of the board closest to them, and turn the dice so that the values on the top of the dice add up to 25. Each player must always have a total value of 25 on the board at all times. The tenth die is held as a spare. Players then take turns either moving their dice to capture the other player's dice, or exchanging dice values.

=== Movement ===
The active player can choose to move a die in any direction in a straight line for a number of hexes equal to the number of pips showing on the die. The die cannot move through a space occupied by any other die of either side, and cannot move through the center hex. If a die reaches the side of the board and still has movement left, it "wraps" around the board (reappears in the analogous hex on the opposite side of the board). If a die "hits" the end of the board and still has movement left, it caroms off the end at a corresponding angle.

If a die ends its turn on a space occupied by a die of the same color, the incoming die will "bump" the occupying die one space in the same direction. If the second die moves into a space occupied by a third die of the same color, the third die is also bumped.

If a die ends its turn in the center hex (called the "chamber space"), it is split in two: the player brings on a reserve die and both dice receive half the amount of pips the incoming die had (unless the incoming die had an odd number, in which case the incoming die will retain the extra pip.)

=== Capturing dice ===
When a die ends its turn on a hex occupied by their opponent's die, the incoming die captures the defending die. The defender removes the captured die from the board, and adds the number of pips on that die to another die still on the board (thus keeping the total value of pips on that team at 25). For example, the red player moves a red die onto a hex occupied by a blue die with the value of 3. The blue player removes the die from the board, and increases any blue die on the board by 3 to maintain the total point value of 25.

If a player bumps one of their dice and the bumped die lands on an opponent's die, then the bumped die successfully captures the opponent's die.

=== Exchanging value ===
If two die of the same colour are adjacent to each other, the player can choose to have the two dice exchange values instead of moving those dice. The player moves value from one of the dice to the other such that the total value of the two dice remains the same. For example, two adjacent dice with values of 4 and 2 could have their values changed to 5–1, 3-3, 2-4 or 1–5.

=== Ending the Game ===
- Draw: If both players repeat the same moves three turns in a row, the game ends in a draw.
- Victory: A player wins by reducing their opponent to four dice, since this reduces the losing player's maximum total of pips to less than 25.

== Reception ==
Mike Brunton reviewed Chase for White Dwarf #93, and stated that "Chase was deservedly in Omni's Top Ten games when it was released, no bad recommendation in itself. It also gets a highly recommended here."

On the games review website Geeky Hobbies, Eric Mortensen noted "Despite the game being pretty simple, there is quite a bit more strategy to the game than you would expect." Mortensen didn't like the large number of choices to make on each turn, stating "I love games that give you options but there is a point when it becomes too much. Each dice has a possibility of six different movements on every turn." He pointed out that "this can lead to some serious analysis paralysis where you are stuck waiting around for the other player to make their move. [...] If you play with two players that always have to maximize their moves the game can become boring pretty quickly." He concluded with a recommendation to not purchase the game, saying, "I just didn’t find Chase to be that fun to play. [...] The game just feels like an exercise of moving pieces around the board while occasionally capturing some pieces."

== Reviews ==
- Games #68
- 1985 Games 100
