= GIPF Project =

Abstract strategy board games f

The GIPF Project is a series of nine abstract strategy games by designer Kris Burm.

The series is named after the first game, GIPF. All the games take place on some form of hexagonal board. Each of the games, including GIPF, may be played individually. When playing a standard game of GIPF the game is played with normal pieces and GIPF pieces.

However, the series also allows players to link the GIPF game to the other games in the series or even to any game at all. It does this by introducing into the game of GIPF certain new pieces with special powers, called "potentials". Before you start a game of GIPF with potentials, the players decide to which game they link each potential piece. For example, the ZÈRTZ potential piece to a game of ZÈRTZ and the DVONN potential to a game of DVONN. But they could decide just as well to link the ZÈRTZ potential to a coin flip and the DVONN potential to a dice roll. Now, when playing the GIPF game with potentials, they can introduce potential pieces whenever they like (according to the playing rules). As soon as they want to use the special power of one of their potential pieces during the GIPF game, they put the GIPF board aside and play the game linked to that specific potential piece (in the example above ZÈRTZ and DVONN, respectively a coin flip and a dice roll). Upon victory the active player can use the power of the potential piece in the game of GIPF. If the active player loses, the special power of the potential piece cannot be used in the GIPF game.

The idea of introducing additional games that can be used to affect the outcome of the main game came from Burm's childhood, when he and his brother would "race" cars around a rug. For each turn, they would play another game, and the winner of that game would get to roll six dice to determine his car's movement, while the loser would roll just five.

As of 2022, YINSH, TZAAR, DVONN, LYNGK, ZÈRTZ, GIPF, and PÜNCT are, respectively, the 3rd, 8th, 11th, 19th, 20th, 35th, and 80th highest ranked Abstract Games on Boardgamegeek. TAMSK, which was officially removed from the series, is nevertheless ranked 87th. YINSH, DVONN, and ZÈRTZ have each won the Mensa Select award.

== List of games in the series ==
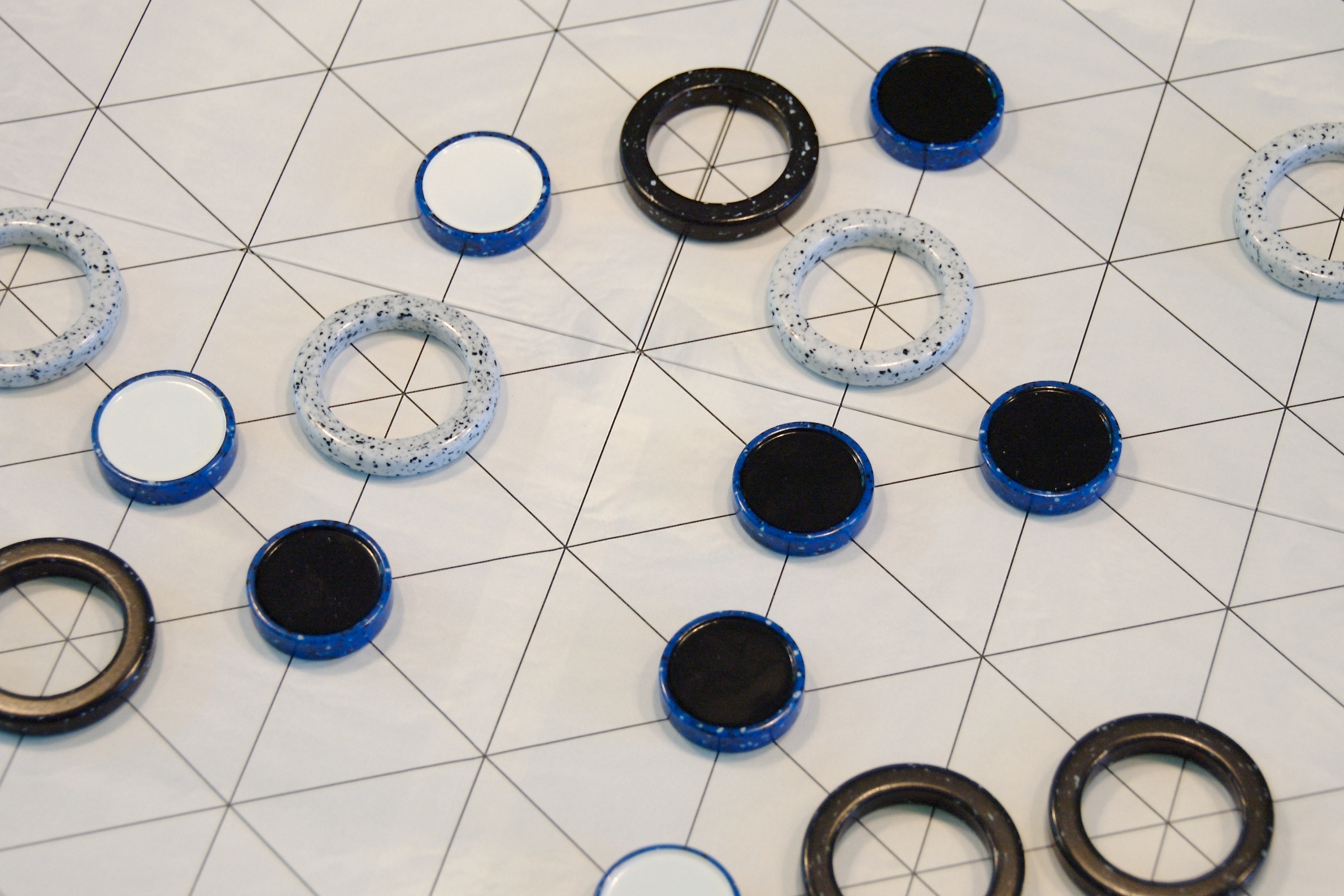
YINSH in play.

- GIPF (1996) is a game of pushing.
- TAMSK (1998) is a game of time (replaced by TZAAR).
- ZÈRTZ (1999) is a game of sacrifice.
- DVONN (2001) is a game of towers.
- YINSH (2003) is a game of flipping.
- PÜNCT (2005) is a game of connection.
- TZAAR (2007) is a game of capture and stacking (replacing TAMSK).
- LYNGK (2017) is a game of networking.
- MATRX GIPF is a game of combining all elements (potentials).

The games are based on elements: TAMSK (time), ZÈRTZ (water), DVONN (fire), YINSH (air), TZAAR (earth), and PÜNCT (the interconnectivity of the brain). These elements are brought together in GIPF.

Most of the games in the series can be played free online (for example, at BoardSpace.net) or against freely available computer opponents.

GIPF

TAMSK

ZÈRTZ

DVONN

YINSH

PÜNCT

TZAAR

LYNGK

== Different type of potentials ==
- The GIPF piece - Strictly speaking the GIPF piece belongs to the standard game of GIPF and is as such not a potential piece (i.e. it is not linked or linkable to any other game, its special power may be used without winning any other game). However it could be considered a normal piece with a special power in the game of GIPF. So conceptually speaking it could be considered a GIPF potential.
- The TAMSK potential - As TAMSK is a game of time, this potential piece grants an additional move to its owner winning him some time in the GIPF game. (Remember: it is impossible to gain extra moves in a standard game of GIPF).
- The ZÈRTZ potential - In ZÈRTZ marbles leap over adjacent marbles to capture them. The ZÈRTZ potential piece allows to leap over an adjacent piece in the GIPF game (remember: leaping over other pieces is not allowed in a standard game of GIPF).
- The DVONN potential - DVONN is a game of stacking pieces. The DVONN potential piece allows the active player in the GIPF game to stack his potential piece on top an opponents normal piece and a such changing the color of the piece of his opponent (remember: stacking is not allowed in a standard game of GIPF)
- The YINSH potential - In YINSH the players move their pieces over one or more empty spaces as long as they move in a straight line. The YINSH potential piece allows a player to move similarly in GIPF. When the YINSH potential is activated in GIPF, the active player can move a piece over one or more empty spaces (remember: pieces are move to the first empty space on the board in a standard game of GIPF).
- The PÜNCT potential - PÜNCT is a game about covering pieces of the opponent with your own pieces. The PÜNCT potential allow the active player to slides his potential piece on top of the PÜNCT potential of your opponent or on top of one of his GIPF pieces (remember: sliding on top of an opponents piece is not allowed in a standard game of GIPF).
- The TZAAR potential - Designer Kris Burm declared that there will be no TZAAR potential. Please note that TZAAR is replacing TAMSK in the GIPF Project. The TAMSK potential suits well with the game TZAAR. In TZAAR the players have each turn the option to perform a second move or not.
- The LYNGK potential - Designer Kris Burn declared that there will be no LYNGK potential.
- The MATRX GIPF potential - No news yet about any additional potential pieces. However the MATRX GIPF game will contain the above potentials.

== Origin of the names of the games ==
GIPF derives from the German word for a mountain summit ("Gipfel"), where the original game was conceived.

Subsequent games were named to include one vowel and 4 consonants, but to otherwise remain unrelated to existing language. TZAAR is the only game deviating from these naming conventions, due to disputes with the game publisher.

== See also ==
- Abalone
- Hex map
