= YINSH =

Abstract strategy board game

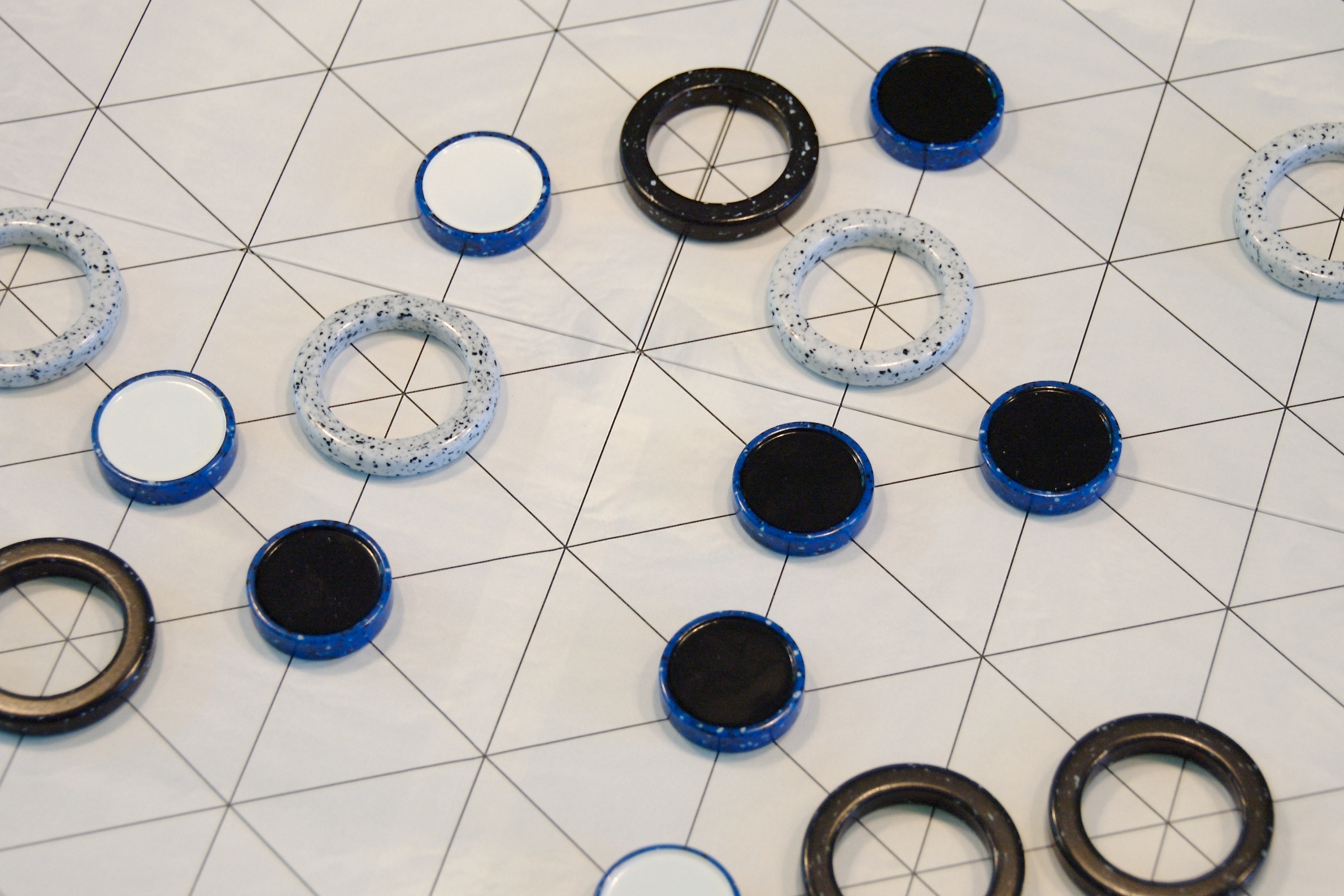
- Close-up of a game in play
- Designers: Kris Burm
- Publishers: Rio Grande Games; Don & Co.
- Publication: 2003; 23 years ago
- Genres: Board game Abstract strategy game
- Players: 2
- Setup time: Negligible
- Playing time: 30 minutes
- Chance: None
- Age range: 8 and up
- Skills: Strategy, tactics

YINSH is an abstract strategy board game by game designer Kris Burm. It is the fifth game to be released in the GIPF Project. At the time of its release in 2003, Burm stated that he intended it to be considered as the sixth and last game of the project, and that the game which he had not yet released, PÜNCT, would be logically the fifth game. However, the series was later expanded to seven games with the release of LYNGK.

Gameplay consists of moving rings to flip Reversi-like discs.

== Rules ==
=== Equipment ===
YINSH board with coordinates

YINSH is played on a board shaped like a truncated six-pointed star with a triangular grid and 85 spaces (referring to the nodes or intersections), including those along the perimeter. The board is oriented so the lines with the letter labels run between the two players. Each space in the game is available for placement of rings and markers

The game pieces are:

- 5 black and 5 white rings
- 51 reversible round disc markers which are black on one side and white on the other, similar to Reversi pieces

The rings are given to the players, while the markers are accessible to both as a common pool.

=== Object ===
The object of the game is to remove three of one's own rings from the game. Since this is the goal of the game, getting closer to winning necessitates weakening oneself, which considerably complicates strategy as a move which brings one closer to winning the game may end up being a very poor move.

=== Gameplay ===
The game starts with an empty board, and proceeds in two phases, placement followed by movement.

==== Placement ====
During the first phase, the players take turns placing one of their rings on the board on any unoccupied space, beginning with white. Once both players each have placed all five of their rings, this phase is over.

==== Movement ====
The second phase involves forming lines, defined as five adjacent markers in a straight line with a single color. Once a line is formed in one player's color (on either player's turn), that player removes the five markers, and also one of their rings. Once a player has removed three of their rings, they win the game.

A turn consists of the following:

1. The player chooses one of their own rings to move.
2. The player places a marker, with their own color face-up, in the middle of that ring on the space it occupies.
3. The player then moves the ring to another unoccupied space, along a straight line from the originating node. The marker never moves. In general, there are six directions from any node, with exceptions along the perimeter of the game board.

When moving a ring, the following rules apply:

- The moving ring may not move over other rings.
- The moving ring may pass over any number of markers in a row. If it does so, it must stop on the blank space immediately following the last marker moved over.
  - All markers moved over like this are flipped over after moving the ring, reversing their color.
- A moving ring may not end on a space already occupied by a marker.

It is possible, and not uncommon, to make a move which results in the opposing player having a line of five markers in a row. When more than one line is made in the same turn, the player who just moved resolves their own lines (if any) first, and then the other player resolves their lines (if any) before making their next move. Lines are resolved one at a time, so if a single marker is shared by two lines, only one of those lines may be resolved (but the player chooses which).

(A) Potential moves for the black ring at E4 are shown with broken rings. Note that K10 is not a possible move, as J9 is the first open space after passing over existing markers; similarly, E1 is not possible. Also, C2 and A4 are blocked by rings.

(B) Black has decided on the move (B)E4→E10 , which results in the placement of a black marker at E4 and the reversal of the colors of the five markers from E5–E9.

While not stated in the official rules, Burm responded to an email asking what to do in the highly unusual situation that the current player's rings were all blocked, and could not make a legal move. He wrote that the player would pass the turn until that player could move a ring again (and must).

If all of the markers are placed on the board before either player has won, the game ends, with the winner being the player who has removed more rings. If both players have removed the same number of rings at this point, the game ends in a draw.

== Video games ==
No official online versions of YINSH exist, but there are number of unofficial implementations. Notably the web-based biskai.de , Boardspace.net, and pureabstracts. On mobile, there is Shyring for iOS, published in December 2014. In 2025, YINSH was added to Board Game Arena and is currently in public beta.
