= Hex map =

Map subdivided into a hexagonal tiling, small regular hexagons of identical size

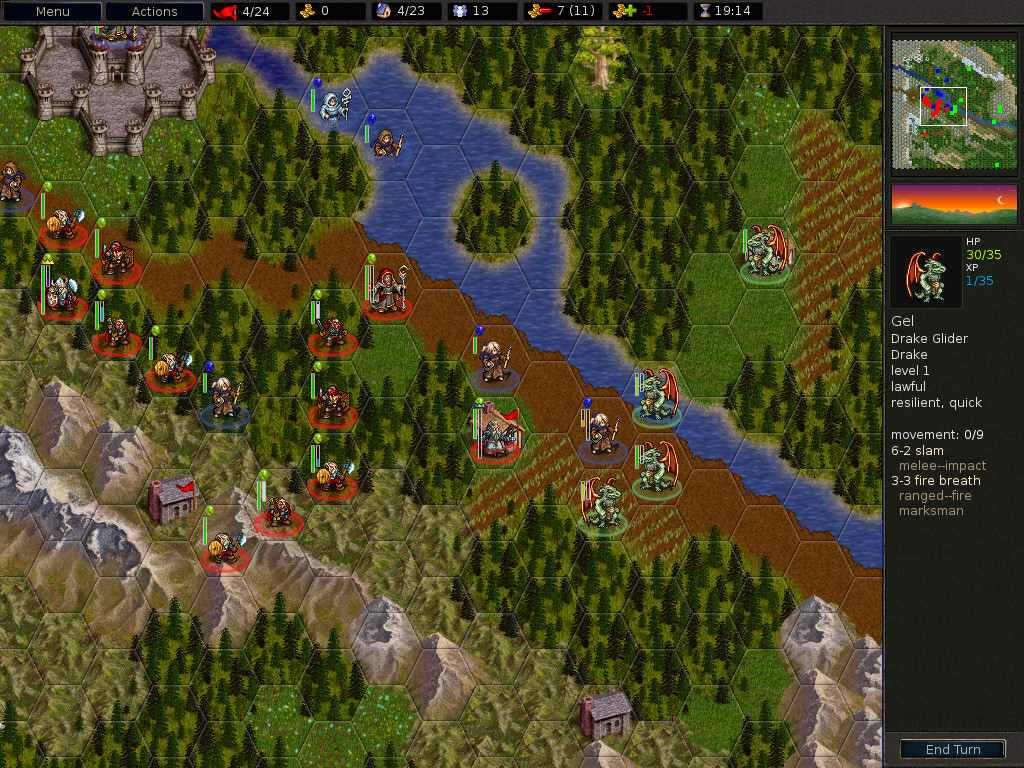
The Battle for Wesnoth, a computer game based on the hex grid

A hex map, hex board, or hex grid is a game board design commonly used in simulation games of all scales, including wargames, role-playing games, and strategy games in both board games and video games. A hex map is subdivided into a hexagonal tiling, small regular hexagons of identical size.

== Advantages and disadvantages ==
Hexagonal (middle) vs equivalent circle (top) vs staggered rectangular tilings (bottom)

The primary advantage of a hex map over a traditional square grid map is that the distance between the center of each and every pair of adjacent hex cells (or hexes) is the same. By comparison, in a square grid map, the distance from the center of each square cell to the center of the four diagonal adjacent cells it shares a corner with is $\sqrt{2}$ times that of the distance to the center of the four adjacent cells it shares an edge with. This equidistant property of all adjacent hexes is desirable for games in which the measurement of movement is a factor. The other advantage is the fact that neighbouring cells always share edges; there are no two cells with contact at only a point.

One disadvantage of a hex map is that hexes have adjacent cells in only six directions instead of eight, as in a square grid map. Commonly, cells will form continuous straight lines "up" and "down", or "north" and "south", in which case the other four adjacent cells lie "north-west", "north-east", "south-west" and "south-east". As a result, no hex cell has an adjacent hex cell lying directly east or west of it, making "horizontal" movement in a straight line impossible. Instead, paths in these directions, and any other path that does not bisect one of the six cell edges, will "zig-zag"; since no two directions are orthogonal, it is impossible to move forward in one direction without moving backwards slightly in the other.

Games that traditionally use the four cardinal directions, or otherwise suit a square grid, may adapt to a hex grid in different ways. For example, hexagonal chess replaces the four directions of orthogonal movement (along ranks and files) with the six directions to adjacent cells, through cell edges. The four directions of diagonal movement are likewise replaced with the six directions that lie through vertices of the cell; these "diagonal" movements travel along the edge between a pair of adjacent cells before arriving at another cell. A three-colour grid aids in visualising this movement, since it preserves the traditional chessboard's property that pieces moving diagonally land only on cells of the same colour.

Advantage of hex maps in games: consistent distance from center to center compared to squares.
This distance is $\sqrt{3}$ times that of a hexagon side.

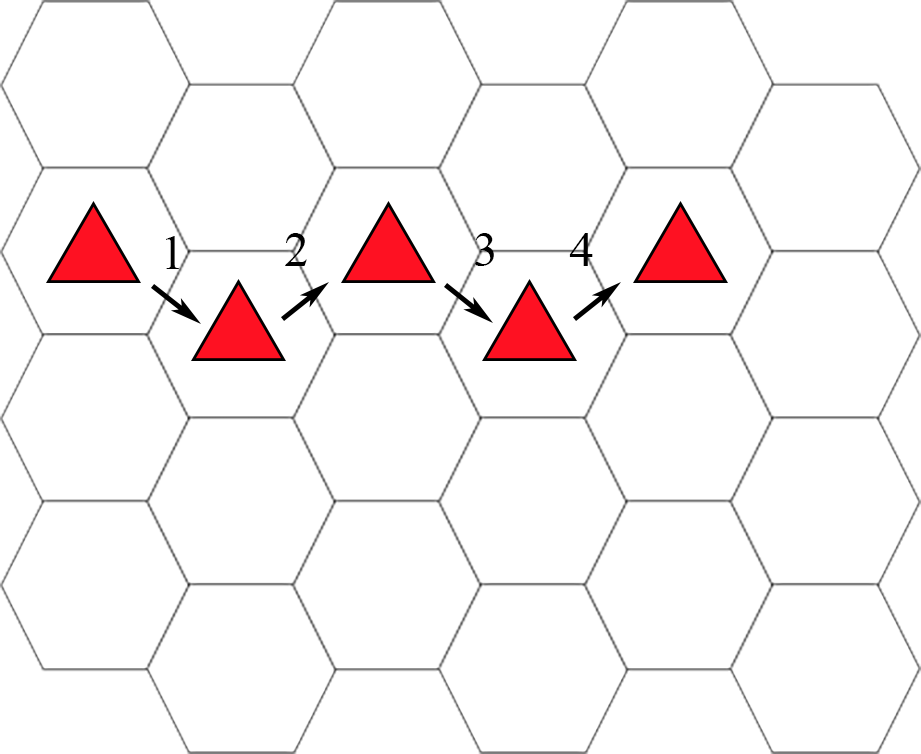
Horizontal movement on a hex map. Vertical movement is required.

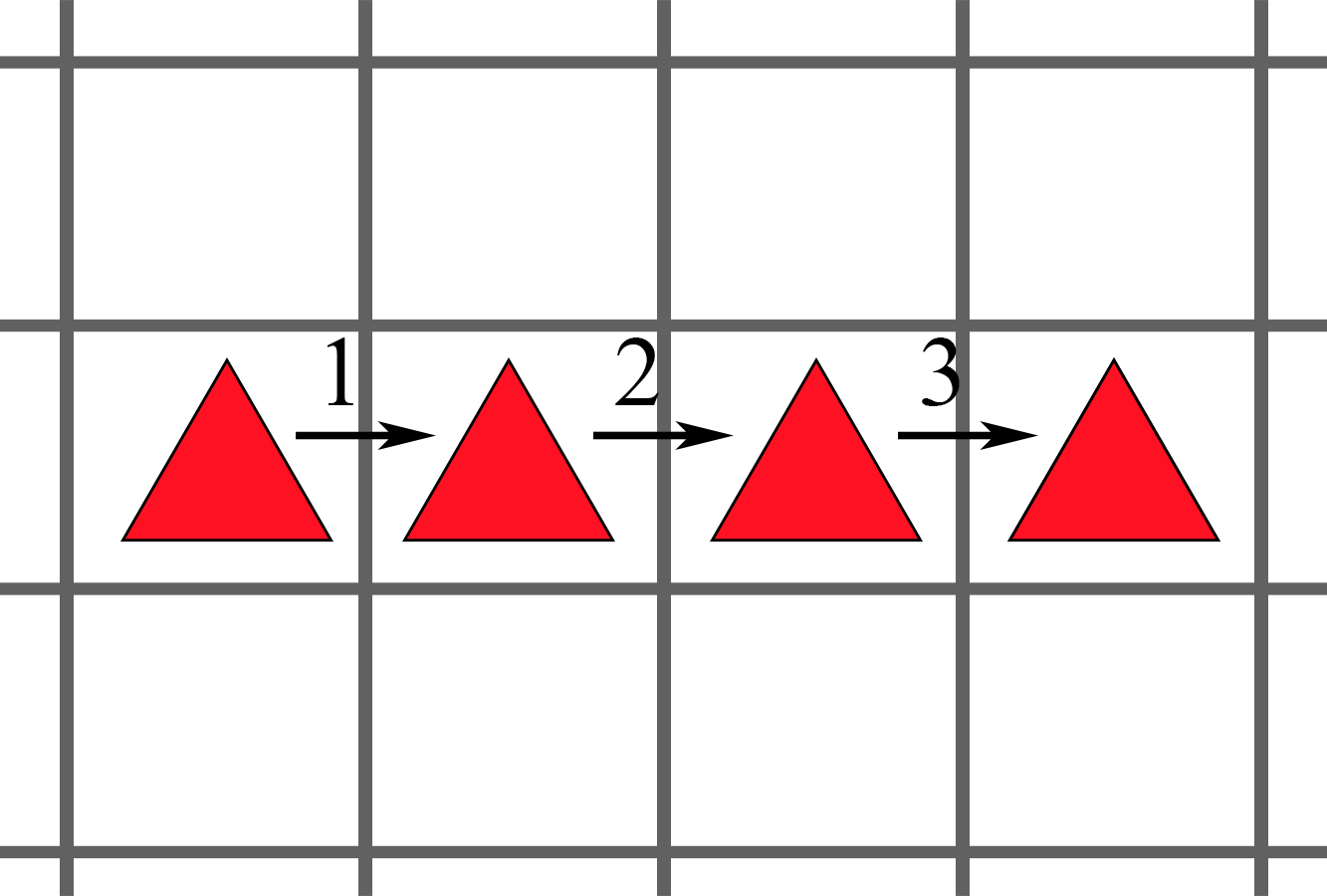
Horizontal movement on a square map. Vertical movement is not required.

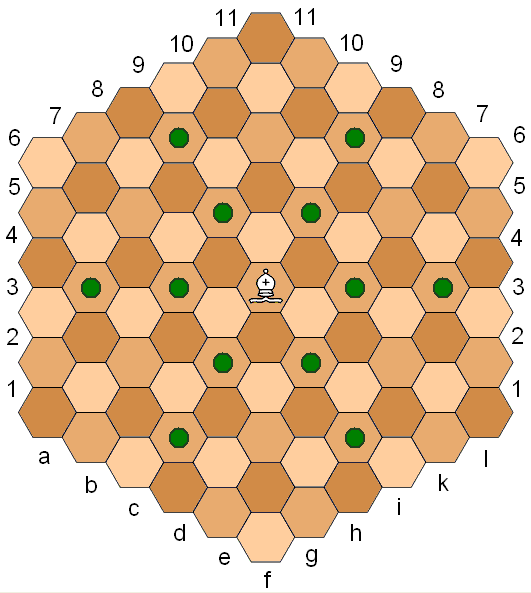
A hexagonal chess board, showing the three-colour system and the diagonal moves of a bishop.

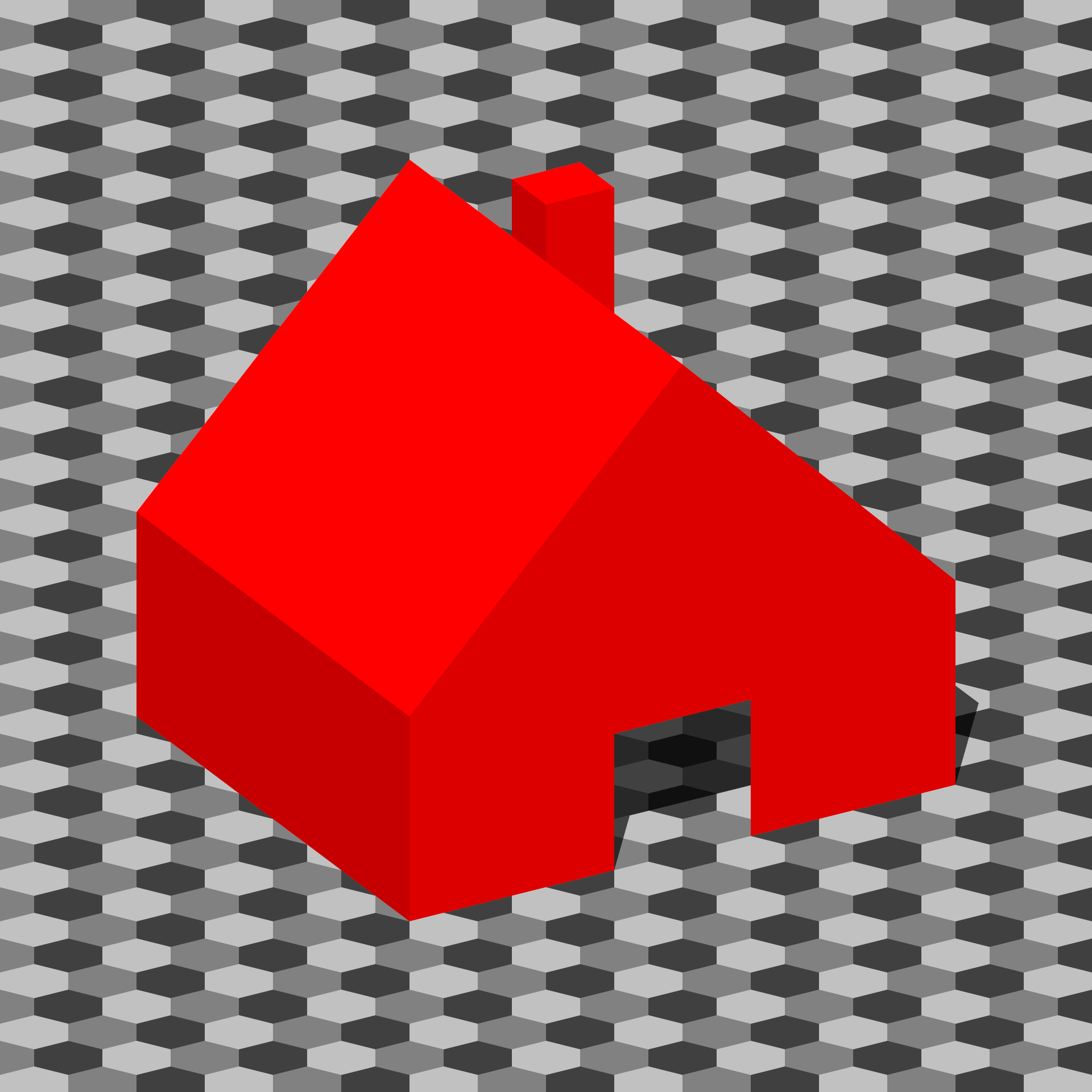
POV-Ray render mimicking Fallout's trimetric projection and hexagonal grid.

== Uses ==
A Catan board

The hex map has been a favourite for game designers since 1961, when Charles S. Roberts of the Avalon Hill game company published the second edition of Gettysburg with a hex map. The hex grid is a distinguishing feature of the games from many wargame publishers, and a few other games (such as The Settlers of Catan).

The hex map has also been popular for role-playing game wilderness maps. They were used in the Dungeons & Dragons boxed sets of the 1980s and related TSR products. GDW also used a hex grid map in mapping space for their science-fiction RPG Traveller.

A number of abstract games are played on a hex grid, such as

- Abalone
- the six games of the GIPF series
- Hex
- Havannah
- Y
- Chinese checkers
- Agon

Several variants of chess have also been invented for a hex board.

The television game show Blockbusters (1980–1982, 1987) was also based on a hex grid.

Early examples of strategy video games that use hex maps include 1983's Nobunaga's Ambition, 1989's Military Madness (the first entry in the Nectaris series), and 1991's Master of Monsters. A hex map was considered during the development of the first Civilization game, but the first four iterations in the Civilization series use square maps; Civilization V, Civilization VI, and Civilization VII use hexagonal maps. Other games that use hex maps are The Battle for Wesnoth, Dragon Age Journeys, Heroes of Might and Magic III, Forge of Empires and UniWar.

== See also ==
- Hexxagon, a board game
- Hex Sheets
- Hexagonal and Grid Mapping System
- Hexagonal tiling
