= PÜNCT =

2005 abstract board game

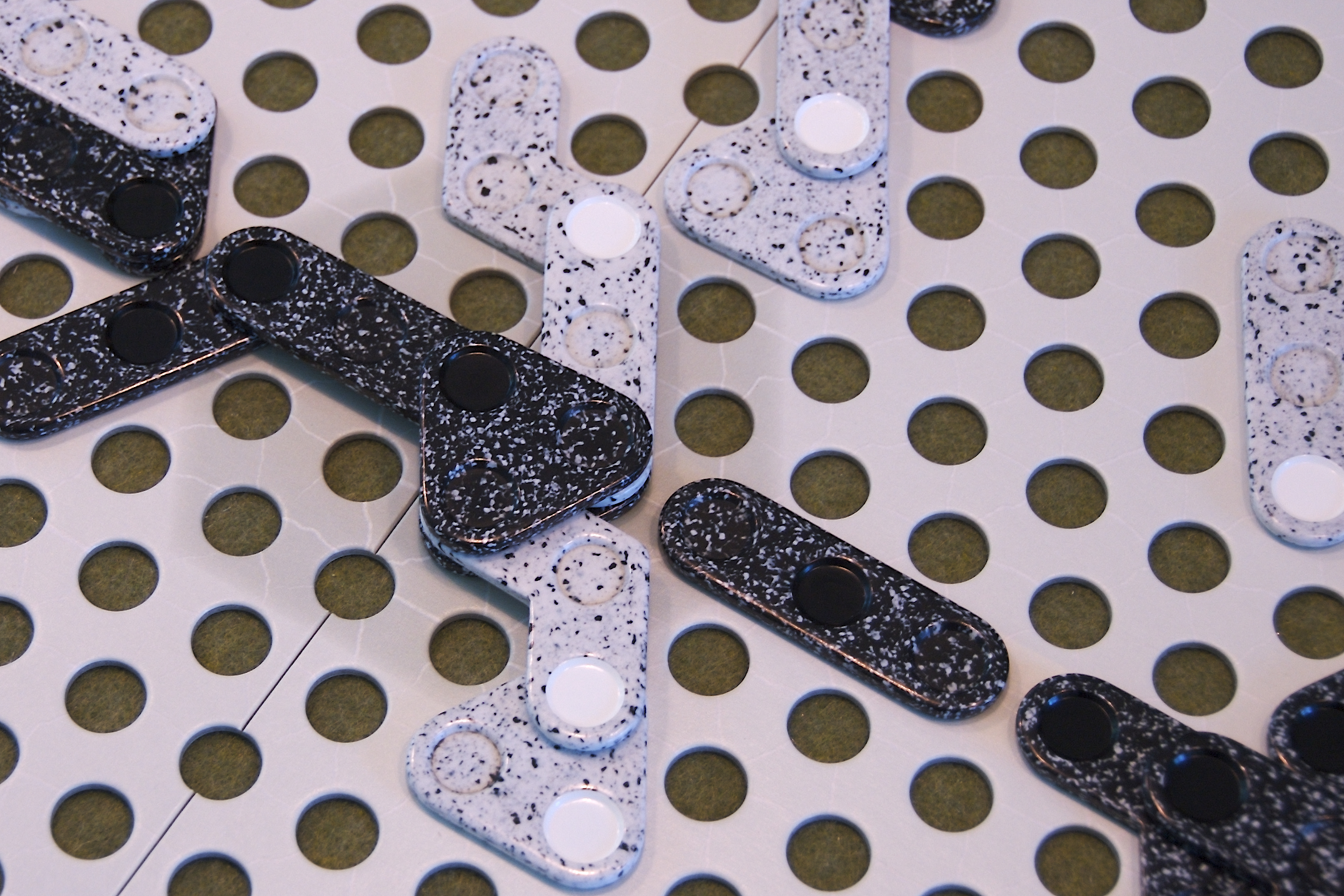
- Close-up of a game in play
- Designers: Kris Burm
- Publishers: Rio Grande Games; Don & Co.
- Publication: 2005; 21 years ago
- Genres: Board game Abstract strategy game Mind sport
- Players: 2
- Setup time: 1 minute
- Playing time: 40 minutes
- Chance: None
- Skills: Strategy

PÜNCT is a two-player strategy board game. It is the sixth release in the GIPF project of seven abstract strategy games, although it is considered the fifth game in the project. It was released in 2005. PÜNCT won the Games Magazine Best Abstract Strategy game for 2007.

== Overview ==
The PÜNCT board game is one of six games a part of the GIPF project. This project was created by Kris Burm and is a series of six abstract games. PÜNCT is the 5th game of the project and the board of this game is shaped like a hexagon. This game was released in 2005.

PÜNCT is a two-player connection game similar in concept to Hex and Y. The objective is to connect two sides of a hexagonal board, using pieces which cover three hexes each. The pieces can be placed, moved, rotated, and stacked in various ways, restricted by the geometry of the board, the shape of the pieces, and gravity. Players can bring new pieces to the board or can attempt to connect the pieces already in play. The objective of the game is to mislead the opponent.

== Game rules ==
=== Equipment ===
PÜNCT board with address labels

The game is played on a clipped regular hexagonal board with 9 spaces on a side; the 6 corners are removed, resulting in 211 spaces. The first play is restricted from playing a piece in the central 3×3 hexagonal region.

Each player has 18 playable pieces. Each playable piece occupies three adjacent spaces on the board. One cell is colored and called the PÜNCT of the piece. The other two cells of the piece are called minor dots.

PÜNCT pieces (18 + 1 per player)

The 18 playable pieces are:

- 6 straight pieces (2 with the PÜNCT in the middle and 4 with the PÜNCT on the end)
- 6 angular pieces (2 with the PÜNCT in the middle and 2 each with the PÜNCT on either end)
- 6 triangular pieces (the location of the PÜNCT is not relevant, as explained in the movement phase)

In addition, each player is given a single PÜNCT-piece, which occupies a single space and replaces a playable piece temporarily to judge the direction of movement during that phase of the player's turn.

=== Objective ===
The objective of the game is to build a contiguous path using playable pieces in the player's color that spans opposite sides: column A to column Q, or row 1 to row 17, or the side (J2 ... P8) to (B10 ... H16). Pieces with cells that are adjacent to each other are considered contiguous, even if they are on different levels.

=== Gameplay ===
On each turn, the player may choose to either place a piece on the board, or move a piece already in play. The white player takes the first turn. Because there are no pieces on the board at the start, the first turn is always a placement; the sole restriction for the first turn only is the first piece cannot be placed in the 3×3 central hexagonal region.

==== Placement ====
After the first turn, players may place a piece anywhere on the board, including the central hexagon, in any rotational orientation, subject to the following restrictions:

1. The piece being introduced must be placed so that it occupies three spaces.
2. The piece being introduced must be placed at the level of the board. In other words, the new piece cannot be placed on top of pieces already in play.

==== Movement (and/or rotation) ====
Potential moves for the angular piece whose PÜNCT is at M14; the only destinations that are prohibited are E6 and M9.

Alternatively, a player may choose to move an existing piece already in play instead of placing a new piece. The existing piece can be moved according to these rules:

1. The player can only move pieces already in play that are the player's color.
2. The PÜNCT of the piece (the colored dot) must move in a straight line from the originating space. Typically there are six available directions of movement, since the board has a triangular grid.
3. After the piece has been moved, it may be rotated with the PÜNCT of the piece serving as the axis of rotation.
4. Either or both the linear translation and rotation upon arrival can occur in the same turn. That is, a piece can be moved without rotation, or it can be rotated without movement, or it can be both moved and rotated.
5. If a piece is moved to the edge of the board, it must be rotated so that both of the minor dots remain on the board.

The PÜNCT-piece may be useful to help gauge the movement. To use it, replace the piece that is intended to be moved with the single-cell PÜNCT-piece at the same location as the PÜNCT of the piece, then move to the desired location. Once the move has been performed, remove the PÜNCT-piece and replace it with the playable three-cell piece.

==== Jumping ====
The white angular piece whose PÜNCT was at M14 has jumped after translating to F7 and rotating. (W)M14→F7 White has connected their chain and the black chain has been cut at F6.

In certain cases, the movement (and/or rotation) can result in the moved piece jumping on top of other playable piece(s).

1. The linear movement must result in the PÜNCT of the piece landing on top of an existing friendly piece. It may not be placed on top of an existing opponent's piece.
2. As with the standard movement, the moved piece may be rotated after the translation. This rotation can result in the minor dot(s) resting on top of another piece. The minor dots may rest on either a friendly or opposing piece.
3. If any dot on a piece is covered as a result of a jump, the piece that is covered is rendered immobile and cannot be moved or rotated.
4. Generally, the jump must end with all three dots (the PÜNCT of the piece and its minor dots) on the same level. There is an exception, known as bridging a gap, where only two of the three dots are resting on lower-level pieces.
5. There is no limit to the heights/levels; that is, if the first level is considered to be at the board's level and the second level is formed by pieces on top of first-level pieces, third, fourth, fifth, etc. levels could be formed by appropriate jumps.
6. The uppermost level takes precedence. In this way, a player can sever the opponent's chain.

==== Bridging ====
As an exception to the prior rule that requires all three dots to be resting on the same lower level, if the player is bridging a gap using either a straight piece or an angular piece, the middle dot does not need to be resting on a lower level.

1. Only the middle dot can be left unsupported on a bridging straight or angular piece, as the bridging piece will be stable without supporting the middle dot.
2. The triangular piece cannot be used as a bridge.
3. The two end dots must be resting on lower-level pieces of the same level.
4. Any piece under the bridged middle dot is immobile, even if it is possible to pick up that piece and move it without disturbing the bridge.
5. If there is an empty cell underneath the bridged middle dot, it is considered occupied and a piece cannot be slid underneath the bridge.

== Variations ==
The rules outlined above are for the basic version of the game. In the standard version, the first-move rule prohibiting placement in the central 3×3 hexagonal region is extended throughout the game, so no pieces can be placed initially in the central hexagon. Only pieces in play can be moved into (and out of) this region.

In the standard game, the winning condition remains the same: the first player to establish a connection between opposite sides is the winner. However, there is a secondary tie-breaker: if all of the pieces have been played, players can count the number of spaces controlled and the winner is the one who controls the most spaces on the board.
