= DVONN =

Abstract strategy board game

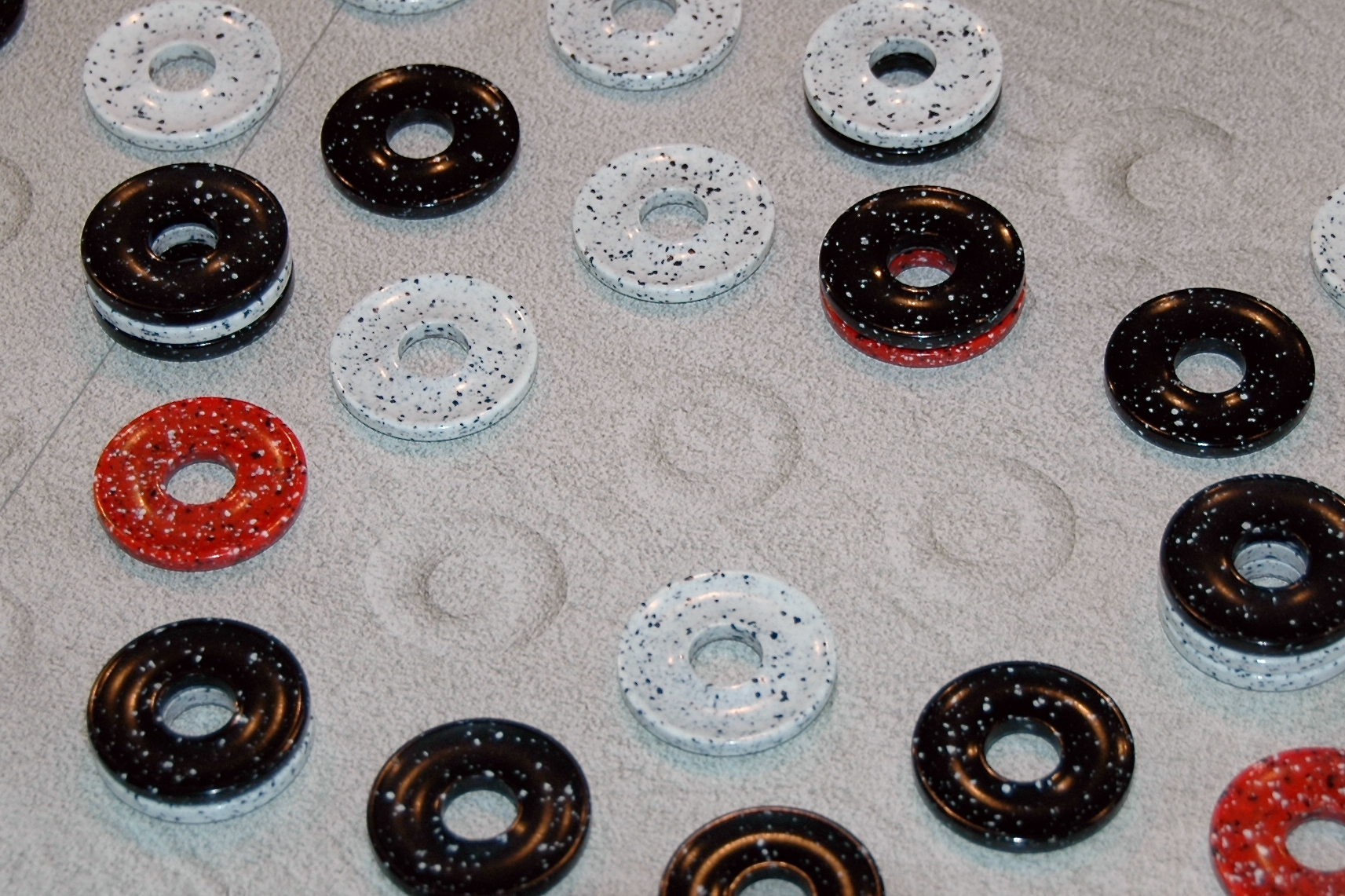
- Close-up board and game pieces
- Designers: Kris Burm
- Publishers: Rio Grande Games; Don & Co. SmartGames
- Publication: 2001; 24 years ago
- Genres: Board game Abstract strategy game
- Players: 2
- Setup time: Negligible
- Playing time: 30 minutes
- Chance: None
- Age range: 8 and up
- Skills: Strategy, tactics

DVONN is a two-player strategy board game in which the objective is to accumulate pieces in stacks. It was released in 2001 by Kris Burm as the fourth game in the GIPF Project. DVONN won the 2002 International Gamers Award and the Games magazine Game of the Year Award in 2003.

== Rules ==
=== Equipment ===
DVONN game boards

Hexagonal cells

Equivalent triangular grid

DVONN is played on a board with 49 spaces. The board has a hexagonal layout 5 hexes wide. Equivalently, the board can be considered to be a hexagonal shape with three intersecting nodes on four sides, and nine nodes on two longer sides opposite each other. These nodes are connected by a triangular grid, similar to other games in the GIPF Project.

The set includes 49 colored pieces. One player has 23 black pieces to play, while the other player has 23 white pieces. There are also 3 neutral red pieces, called DVONN pieces.

=== Object ===
The object of the game is to control more pieces than your opponent at the end of the game.

=== Game phases ===
The game starts with an empty board and proceeds in two phases: first the players take turns filling the board in the placement phase, then players build stacks of pieces during the movement phase. To start, players determine which one moves first; that player is assigned two of the red DVONN pieces and the twenty-three white pieces. The other player is assigned one DVONN piece and the twenty-three black pieces.

==== Placement ====
During the first phase, the players place their pieces on the board, starting with the three red DVONN pieces. Pieces can be placed on any unoccupied space. White starts, and the players alternate. So Black is the first to place a piece of their own color. The first phase ends when all pieces are placed on the board, filling it completely.

==== Movement ====
DVONN game in progress, with stack heights for illustration.

Players build stacks of pieces during the second phase by moving pieces and stacks onto other pieces or stacks.

Relevant definitions:

1. Stack mobility is determined by the number of surrounding stacks. If a stack is surrounded by 6 adjacent stacks, it is immobile and cannot be moved.
2. A stack is owned by a player if their color is on top.
3. The height of a stack h is equal to the number of pieces in the stack. In this phase, "stacks" and "pieces" are used interchangeably, with the understanding that a piece is simply a stack with one member or height h = 1.

During the movement phase:

1. The white player takes the first move in the movement phase. Because the board is completely filled, the white player must move a white piece on the perimeter of the board as the first move.
2. The height h of a stack determines the number of spaces that stack will move. In the illustrated example, the only legal move for the black-owned stack of two at D3 is two spaces to the right to F3, denoted (2B)D3→F3 The white-owned stack of nine pieces at I5 is effectively immobile, as there are no legal moves.
3. All moves must follow a straight line; most interior spaces have six potential directions for movement, while the perimeter spaces have four directions, and the corner spaces have three. The triangular-gridded board illustrates this clearly.
4. Stacks cannot be moved onto an empty space. All moves must terminate on an occupied space. However, stacks may jump over empty or occupied spaces.
5. Single DVONN pieces cannot be moved, but they can be moved once they are part of a stack. For example, the black-owned stack at C2 could be moved on top of the DVONN piece at F2: (3B)C2→F2
6. After each move, all stacks that are not connected via adjoining stacks to a DVONN pieces (or stacks with a DVONN piece) are removed from the board. For instance, if the white piece at F1 is moved to the DVONN piece at F2 (1W)F1→F2 , that disconnects the black piece at G1, and it would be removed from the board. Similarly, the move (1W)J4→J5 would disconnect the white stack of two at K4 and remove it from the board, which would not be advantageous for the white player.

=== Passing and game end ===
A player is not allowed to pass unless no legal moves are available. The game ends when both players have no legal moves. To determine the winner, each player collects their owned stacks into a single tower. The winner is the player with the higher tower. The game ends in a draw in case both players own an equal number of stones in their tower.

The maximum possible number of moves in the game is 97 (49 for placement and 48 in play, passes are not counted). In competition, each player typically gets 15 minutes for the entire game in real-life tournaments, or 10 minutes for online tournaments.

== Strategy ==
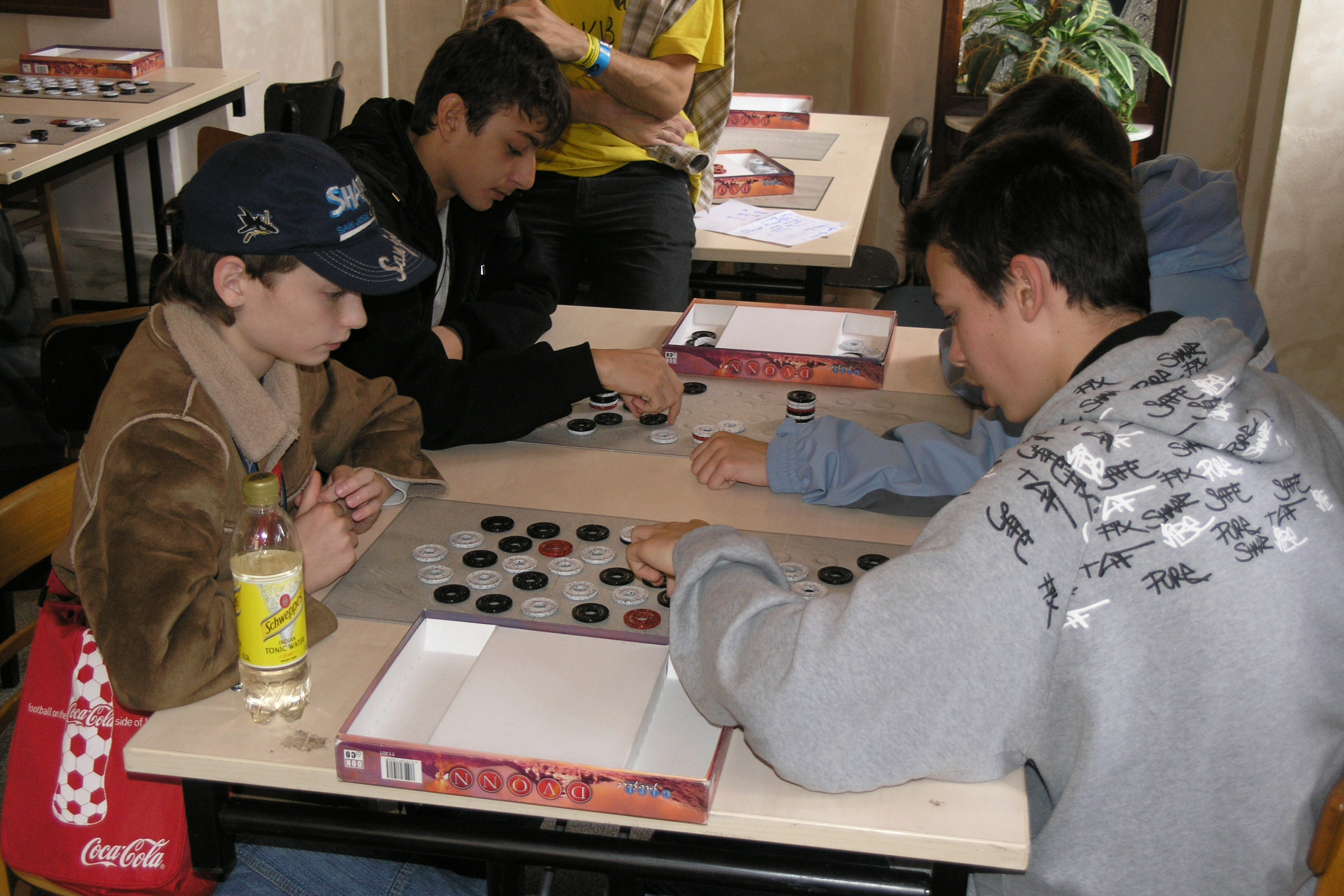
DVONN being played

The rules of DVONN can be learned in a few minutes. The main factor needed to win is to be in control of the game. The basic strategy of the game is given on the GIPF Project website. The more advanced strategy tips are derived from the general strategy guidelines developed by the DVONN guild at the BrettspielWelt game site. In 2003, 2004, and 2008 the game developer, Kris Burm, organized a real life DVONN world championship.

=== Placement phase ===
Many beginner players place their pieces at the start of the game without a clear objective. However, placement is as major a factor in winning as the movement phase. While it is not possible to guarantee victory with a strong setup, it is possible to have no chance of winning by placing your stones badly.

Pieces should be placed with three main goals in mind: spaces by DVONN pieces, spaces by the side, and general density. The first objective is to place pieces by DVONN pieces, thereby keeping them safe from potential separation. Keeping at least three pieces by each DVONN piece helps defend them from potential attack. Next, pieces that are surrounded cannot move; therefore, having pieces along the side to start the game is valuable. Such pieces should also be in position to free other pieces on the inside. Finally, lumping groups of one's own pieces together is usually poor strategy. It is desirable to capture on every move, or at least take a DVONN piece; keeping all of one's pieces together often makes this difficult. Spreading pieces out across the board also increases the chance of maintaining a short (and therefore highly mobile) stack into endgame, where it may be moved into position for a crucial capture.

It may also be possible to string a line of one's own pieces across the board up and down. Play almost always separates along this line; pieces on one side of a string that has no DVONN piece are usually doomed. An additional advantage of placing stones connected in a line is that moving a stone on either end of the line will free another own stone for movement.

Having an even distribution of the DVONN pieces over the board is usually recommended for novice players, since this way they will be less vulnerable against groups of stones being lost by a cut off. Having all 3 red Dvonn pieces grouped together near the edge almost guarantees a win for an experienced player playing with white.

=== Movement phase ===
The first few moves should correct any place where your position must be fixed: helping or moving pieces that could become isolated and moving outside pieces in order to give inside ones mobility. To go for a victory, one should try to recognize if it is possible to isolate part of the board from all the red DVONN pieces in such a way that the isolated part will contain more of the opponents stones than your own. Preferably, always play stones towards the DVONN pieces rather than away from them.

Capturing pieces that could capture a DVONN piece can be important, as a moving DVONN piece controlled by the opponent can isolate a large group of pieces. However, mobility is the most important aspect of DVONN; one needs to keep one's options open. Building a tall stack early in the movement phase is a mistake. Most often, the game is won by the player who is capable of making the last move(s). Maintaining some single stones until the end phase is, therefore, very often a good strategy. As a general rule one can state that using a tower to take a single stone of the opponent usually is one of the better moves, since this preserves own singles. A second general rule for selecting which move to make is that you should not make a move that the opponent cannot prevent you from making at a later time.

A very common mistake among beginners is that they are stacking own stones on top of each other in an attempt to prevent losing stones by being cut off by the opponent. However, since the game is all about mobility, this usually is a bad thing, since by stacking two of their own stones, instead of capturing an opponent's stone, they are effectively losing one stone. Only when a really large group of own stones is at risk, or in the end-phase of the game, should one consider placing own stones on top of each other. In any other situation, it is better to just give up the stone(s) in risk of being isolated and play offensive moves elsewhere and make the opponent lose a similar or preferably larger number of stones on another part of the board.

Taking a DVONN piece is especially desirable if it is possible to move it toward one's own pieces and away from one's opponent's. However, every capture counts, so big captures and maintaining mobility is more important than just taking DVONN pieces. A similar rule applies here as is the case for placing own stones on top of each other. When a DVONN piece is taken, the opponent is not losing a stone, which means that effectively you are set back one stone in the stonecount compared to the opponent. Therefore, one should take a DVONN piece only if one has a plan with it to gain a larger advantage, or if one needs to prevent the opponent from gaining a significant advantage by moving it.

After move 70 (about 20 moves into the movement phase) the board clears and settles. It becomes much more important to look ahead to see how every move affects the overall situation. Tall stacks are very hard to move, so they should be formed next to (or on) DVONN pieces and out of line of potential captures.

=== Strategy terminology ===
DVONN strategy discussions among expert players often use a number of terms to express the game situation. In the Yahoo Gipf discussion group the development of this list of terms was initiated by Alan Kwan and completed by Kris Burm.

== Dvonn playing computer programs ==
There are many computer programs capable of playing Dvonn at a high level. Some of the early ones include:

- dDvonn
- Dvonner
- RoRoRo the Bot
- Jan's Dvonn program

RoRoRo the Bot and Jan's program used to play online at the LittleGolem games site until 2014 and 2016 respectively, and were usually among the top 10 players.

Holtz is a program supporting multiple games, including Dvonn.

Dvonn was the topic of the 2011 CodeCup which produced many high-level computer players, including contest winner PrimaDvonna.

== Reviews ==
- Pyramid
- Family Games: The 100 Best
