= Character Sheets =

Fantasy role-playing game supplement published by Games Workshop

- Cover
- Genre: Role-playing game
- Publisher: Games Workshop
- Media type: Print

Character Sheets is a supplement for fantasy role-playing games published by Games Workshop in 1978.

== Contents ==
Character Sheets is a player's aid: a pad of character record sheets. It is also for use with Advanced Dungeons & Dragons.

== Publication history ==
Character Sheets was written by Alan Hunter, and was published by Games Workshop in 1978 as 50-sheet pad.

Games Workshop began expanding its publishing beyond White Dwarf and reprints of products from American publishers, and Shannon Appelcline noted that "Among their first original products were a pad of character sheets (1978), a pad of hex sheets (1978), and the Dungeon Floor Plans (1979) gaming accessory, each of which carried the Dungeons & Dragons trademark" making them some of the few licensed products that TSR ever authorized for D&D.
