= Kris Burm =

Belgian game designer

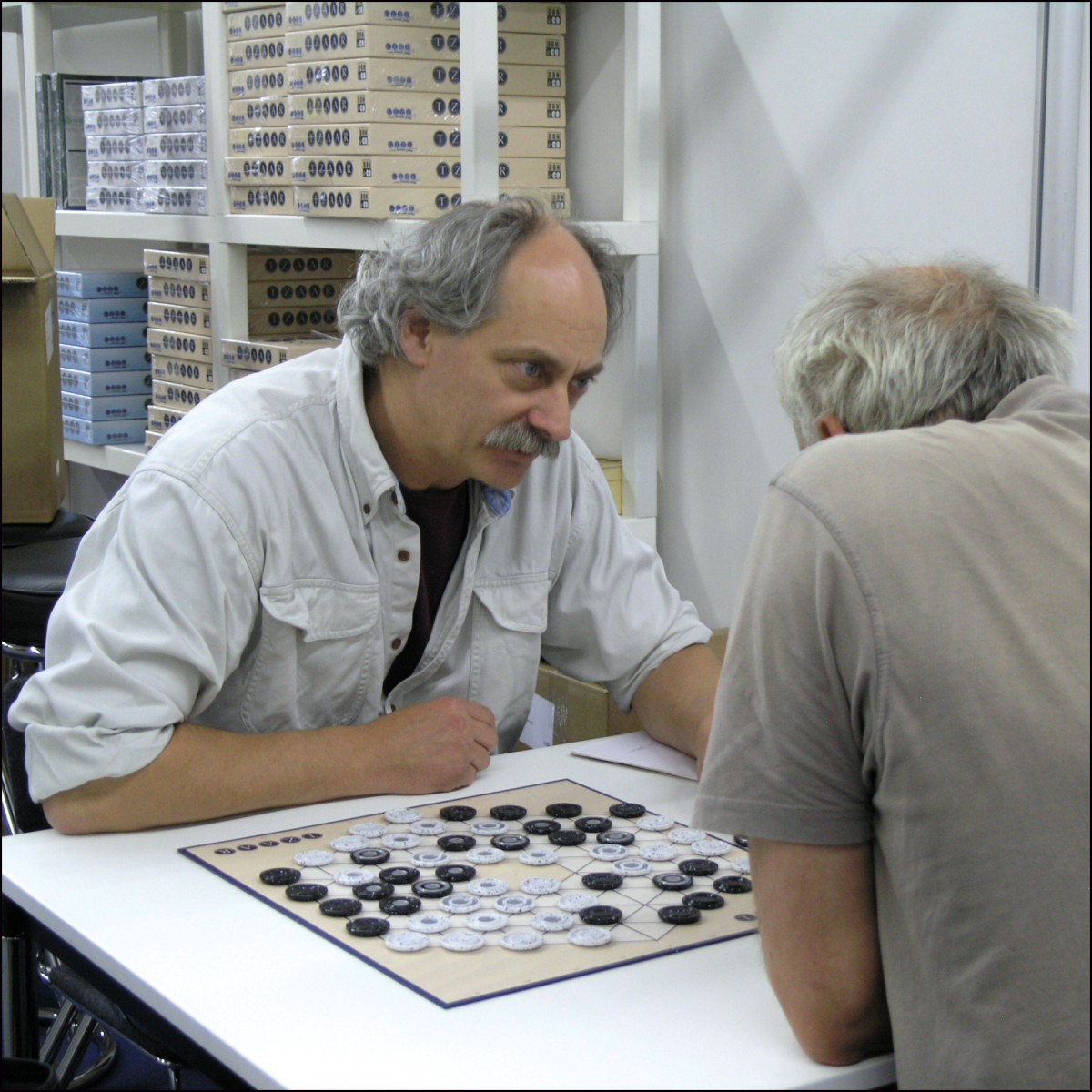
Kris Burm

Kris Burm (born 1957) is a Belgian game designer specializing in abstract board games. He is best known for his award-winning GIPF series of games. He was born in Antwerp, Belgium in 1957 and moved to nearby Schilde in 2005.

== Ludography ==
- Invers (1991)
- Oxford (1993)
- Balanx (1994)
- Flix (1995)
- Orient (1995)
- Tashkent (3x3) (1995)
- Quads (1996)
- **GIPF** (1996)
- Batik (1997)
- Tashkent (5x5) (1997)
- Bi-litaire (1997)
- Dicemaster (1997)
- TAMSK (1998)
- **ZÈRTZ** (2000)
- **DVONN** (2001)
- Elcanto (2001)
- **YINSH** (2003)
- **PÜNCT** (2005)
- **TZAAR** (2007)
- **LYNGK** (2017)
- **MATRX GIPF** (2024)

Games that are part of the GIPF Project in bold. All his published games are abstract, except Dicemaster, which is a collectible dice game.
