= SmartGames =

Belgian toy company

Smart Toys and Games
- Company type: Private company
- Industry: Toys and games
- Founded: December 7, 1992
- Founders: Rolf Vandoren; Ariane Van den Bossche
- Headquarters: Kontich, Belgium
- Area served: Worldwide
- Key people: Rolf Vandoren (CEO)
- Products: Puzzle games, educational toys
- Brands: SmartGames, SmartMax, GeoSmart, Happy Cube, The Genius Square
- Website: www.smartgames.eu

Smart Industries NV (also known as Smart NV, Smart Toys and Games by its brand name SmartGames) is a Belgian manufacturer of educational toys and puzzles, best known for its single-player logic games. The company was founded in 1992 and is headquartered in Kontich, Belgium.

== History ==
Smart Toys and Games was founded by Rolf Vandoren and Ariane Van den Bossche, initially as a distributor of other educational toy brands. In the mid-1990s, the company began developing its own products, introducing what it described as the first “one-player multi-level logic game” for children. The early SmartGames puzzles featured simple mechanics that challenged players to place pieces (such as roads, boats or penguins) on a game board to solve structured challenges. By demonstrating these games in toy shops, the founders found a market for logic puzzles that engage children while building cognitive skills.

As its puzzle games gained popularity, Smart expanded its reach beyond Belgium. The company established a U.K. branch (Smart Toys and Games UK) and a U.S. office to distribute its products internationally. In the 2020s, Smart Toys and Games grew through acquisitions: it purchased the British puzzle maker The Happy Puzzle Company in 2022, the online retailer All Jigsaw Puzzles in 2023, and the preschool toy brand Wow Toys in 2024.

In January 2026, it was announced that Smart Toys and Games had acquired the Dutch company, Recent Toys International, with the transaction having been completed in the fourth quarter of 2025. Founded in 2001, Recent Toys International specialises in mechanical brainteasers and puzzle products, and the acquisition expanded Smart Toys and Games’ portfolio within the puzzle and logic games segment.

== Products and brands ==
Smart Toys and Games develops brain-teasing logic puzzles across several brand lines (such as GeoSmart, Happy Cube, IQ Games, SmartGames, SmartMax, and The Genius Square). SmartGames titles include games such as Penguins on Ice, Squirrels Go Nuts! and Quadrillion. The SmartMax is a line of magnetic construction toys, while GeoSmart is a more advanced STEM-focused building set for older children.

== Awards and recognition ==
SmartGames puzzles have numerous awards in the toy and game industry. In Belgium, the SmartGames IQ puzzle series won a Henry van de Velde Award for consumer product design, recognizing the line's innovation in brain-teaser games. Internationally, in the UK, the company's games have earned several Right Start Awards in the Games & Puzzles category. In Denmark, they won several Guldbrikken awards. In Germany, its titles have received multiple Spiel Gut recommendations and awards, as well as one Kindersoftwarepreis Tommi award. In the US several of the company's games have won American Specialty Toy Retailing Association (ASTRA), Games Magazine, Oppenheim Toy Portfolio Awards and Parents' Choice Awards.

Its products have been reviewed multiple times in the Polish Rebel Times gaming magazine (in issues 53, 54, 55, 59, 61, 62. 63, 74 and 81).

== See also ==
- ThinkFun
