= ZÈRTZ =

Strategy board game

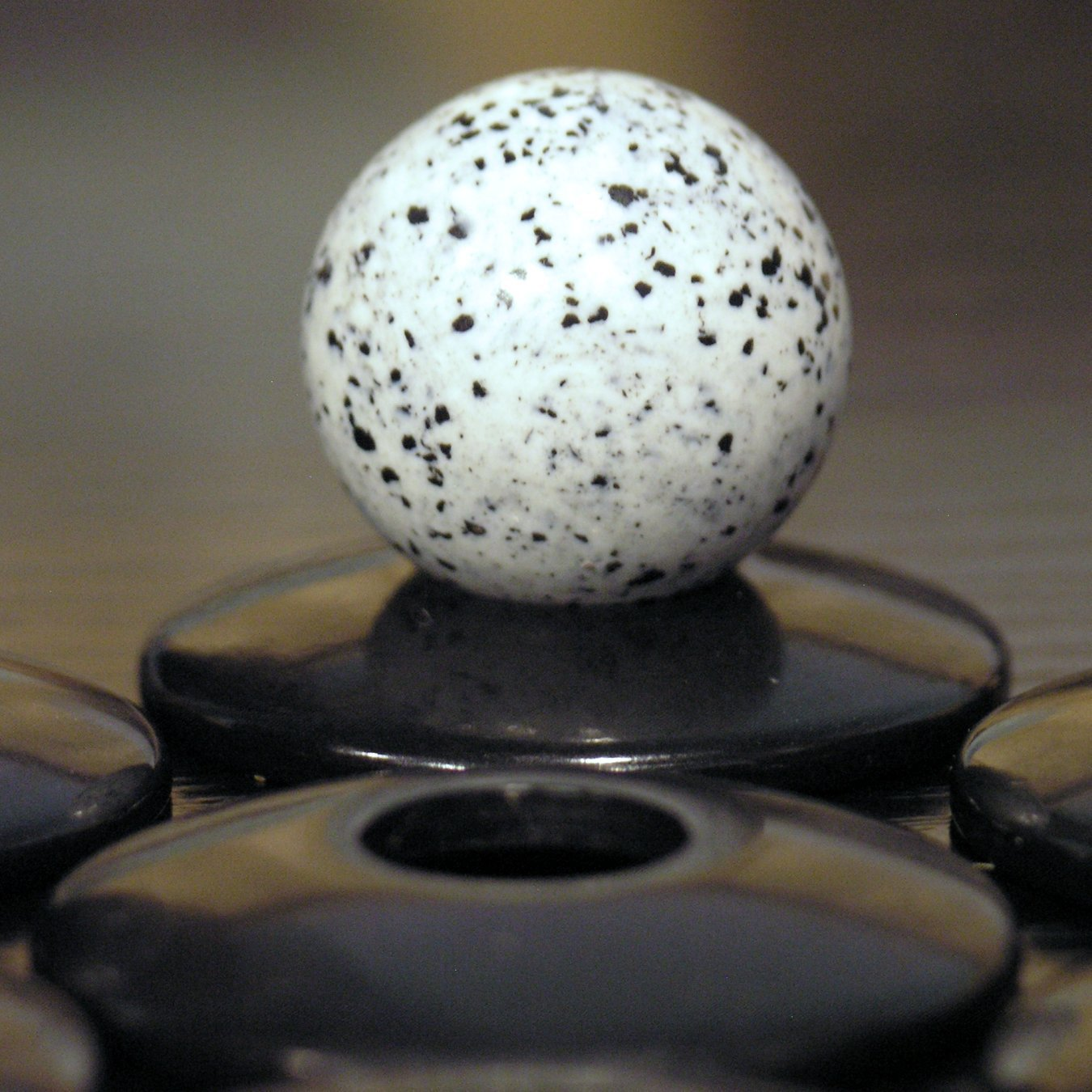
- Playing pieces from the game
- Designers: Kris Burm
- Publishers: Rio Grande Games; Don & Co. Schmidt Spiele
- Publication: 2000; 26 years ago
- Players: 2
- Setup time: 2 minutes
- Playing time: 30 minutes
- Chance: None
- Age range: 8 and up
- Skills: Strategy

ZÈRTZ is the third game in the GIPF Project of seven abstract strategy games. The game features a shrinking board and an object that promotes sacrifice combinations. It is impartial: since neither player owns on-board pieces, maintaining the initiative is of fundamental importance.

== Rules ==
=== Equipment ===
The playing pieces are six white, eight gray, and ten black marbles, and (for the standard game) 37 rings, each of which can hold a marble. Initially, the game was supplied with 37 rings, but newer versions include 49 rings. The GIPF Set 2 expansion includes 12 additional rings, which can be used for larger game boards. Advanced and tournament players use up to 61 rings, which requires acquisition of a GIPF Set 2 expansion.

=== Setup ===
Players place the rings on a flat surface and arrange them as a packed hexagon, as regularly as possible. This composes the "board". With 37 rings, this forms a perfect hexagon with four rings on a side. Starting configurations with additional rings are shown in the gallery below. The marbles go into a shared pool.

Starting configurations for ZÈRTZ

37 rings & 4/side

40 rings & 3–5/side

43 rings & 3–6/side

44 rings & 4–5/side

48 rings & 4–5/side

61 rings & 5/side

=== Object ===
The object is to capture a majority of one color (n/2+1: four white, or five gray, or six black marbles), or three marbles of each color.

=== Gameplay ===
The two players determine who will go first. For each turn, the player may either jump or drop.

1. If a jump is available, the player is required to jump instead of drop.
2. Jumping means the player will capture one or more marbles through a mechanic similar to Checkers, in which one marble may jump over an adjacent marble when there is a free space on the other side.
3. Dropping means the player will place a new marble on the board and take away one free ring.

==== Jumping ====
Example of potential jumps

If any two marbles are adjacent on the board, and there is room for one to jump the other, landing on an unoccupied ring immediately opposite the other, a player must jump instead of dropping. The jumping player captures any jumped marbles. The player must continue to jump with the same marble as long as additional jumps by the same marble are possible. If at any stage of jumping more than one jump is possible, the player may choose any direction; however, the player must continue jumping with the same marble for as long as at least one other marble is jumpable by the moving marble. (This is similar to the compulsory jumping rule in Checkers.)

No rings are removed on a jumping turn.

In the example illustrated here, the following jumps (or jump sequences) are possible:

- White marble at E5: (W)E5→C5→A3→A1 , captures grey marble at D5 and black marbles at B4 and A2
- White marble at E5: (W)E5→C5→E7 , captures grey marble at D5 and white marble at D6
- White marble at D6: (W)D6→D4→F6 , captures grey marble at D5 and white marble at E5
- Grey marble at D5: (G)D5→F5 , captures white marble at E5

Notice the jump (W)E5→C5 offers a choice of two directions after being taken, either (W)C5→A3 or (W)C5→E7 .

==== Dropping ====
Example illustrating free rings

If no jumps are available, the player whose turn it is must drop a marble of any color onto an empty ring of the board, then remove a free ring from the board. A ring is free if it is unoccupied and can be detached by sliding it away on the table surface without displacing other rings. In the example illustrated here, the free rings are [A1], [A2], [B1], [D7], [E4], [F4], [G4], and [G5].

There are two special cases:

1. If removing a ring produces a cluster of one or more rings, called an island, with a marble on each ring in the cluster, all of these rings are also removed, and the player whose move created the island captures all the marbles on it.
2. If no ring is free, the player's turn ends when he drops a marble. If no marbles are available in the shared pool, the player must drop one of his captured marbles instead.

== Strategy ==
The basic strategy in ZÈRTZ is sacrifice. Because a player is forced to capture when possible, a common strategy is for one player to play so that the other must capture a piece of low importance. This moves other pieces into a position where the first player can then capture one or more pieces of higher importance. In addition, sacrifices are used to arrange pieces and gain time in preparation for capture by isolation. Frequently a game will end with one player forcing the other to repeatedly jump, gaining time to win with a capture by isolation.

== Variants ==
=== Blitz ===
A short Blitz version of the game can be played using a reduced set of 5 white marbles, 7 gray, and 9 black marbles. In this case, the goal is to capture only a majority of one set (three whites, four grays, or five blacks), or two of each color. This variant is described in the original edition as the basic rules.

=== ZÈRTZ+11 ===
This is the game of ZÈRTZ played with 11 extra rings, forming an irregular hexagon with sides alternating between 4 and 5 rings. This is the current standard for serious tournament play.

=== ZÈRTZ+24 ===
This is ZÈRTZ played with 24 extra rings, forming a regular hexagon with 5 rings along each side. It has been suggested that this will eventually become the tournament standard."ZÈRTZ+24". BoardSpace. September 2, 2004.
