= Dungeon Floor Plans =

Supplement for fantasy role-playing games

- Cover
- Genre: Role-playing game
- Publisher: Games Workshop
- Media type: Print

Dungeon Floor Plans is a supplement for fantasy role-playing games published by Games Workshop in 1978.

== Contents ==
Dungeon Floor Plans is an aid for the gamemaster consisting of cardstock sheets that can be used as dungeon floors, passages, stairs, and more to be used with 25mm miniatures for Dungeons & Dragons or Advanced Dungeons & Dragons. It was a set of terrain tiles intended to combine together to form various locations.

Dungeon Floor Plans is a package that includes twelve thick cardboard sheets, each printed in colors to represent different types of flooring, with flagstone in tan, rough stone and dirt in grey, wood in brown and stone stairways in grey. The sheets are presented as squares overlaid with grid patterns, with the lines incorporated into the design. The squares are set to scale to fit with 25mm figures, with each square slightly over 2 cm x 2 cm in size to represent a 5' x 5' area. The Dungeon Master can cut the sheets and lay them out on the tabletop to create a series of rooms and corridors as large as is needed.

== Publication history ==
Dungeon Floor Plans was published by Games Workshop in 1979 as 12 color cardstock sheets.

Games Workshop wanted to extend its publishing beyond White Dwarf and reprinting products from America, with some of their first original products being their pads of Character Sheets (1978) and Hex Sheets (1978), and the accessory Dungeon Floor Plans (1979), each of which was printed with the Dungeons & Dragons trademark, and were among the few licensed Dungeons & Dragon products that TSR approved. Games Workshop later reprinted the Dungeon Floor Plans in 1982 without the D&D logo as the first among several gaming supplements.

Games Workshop later produced a set of compatible Dungeon Mapping Sheets in 1982, as a grid formed of 2.5mm squares.

== Reception ==
Peter Darvill-Evans reviewed Dungeon Floor Plans for White Dwarf #13, and rated it a 9 out of 10. He commented that "From a distance, the front of the package looks like an early 1950s television made of bright orange bakelite, with a bad case of interference right across the screen! I suppose it is eyecatching. The back, on the other hand, is very informative, giving a complete description of the Dungeon Floor Plans, a clear diagram, and instructions for use." Darvill-Evans continued by saying "These sheets are not, of course, floor plans in themselves. The idea is that the DM should cut up the sheets and use pieces to lay out sections of his dungeon for the benefit of the players to map his dungeon and/or move their character figures along. An infinite number of dungeon sections can be created, suitable for any role-playing game or small-scale combat simulation, but specifically "endorsed by TSR Hobbies, Inc. for use with Original, Basic or Advanced Dungeons & Dragons"." He added: "considering it is all in two dimensions, the effect is incredibly realistic – the floors are cracked, the wood has a grain to it, the stairs even have shadows to indicate whether they are ascending or descending. A half-square of wood can be used as a table, or a chest, or as a door which, when placed between the corridor and room sections, automatically forms a wall-thickness of 2 ½' scale. After years of feeling very out of place on a bright green Cul-de-Sac board, and even sometimes simply roaming across a deserted table, my characters can at last look quite at home on a playing surface that looks attractive, is easy to use, adds atmosphere to the game, and, not least, speeds up and simplifies combat." Darvill-Evans stated that "There are only two possible criticisms: firstly, that laying out a complete dungeon area might make it too easy to map, and secondly, that the wall-thickness formed by the doors have to be allowed for by the DM in his original plan to avoid distortion." He commented that "Other companies have tried to create this type of playing aid before – Dungeon Decor and The Endless Dungeon are two titles which come to mind, and I'm sure there are others – but Dungeon Floor Plans are far the best designed and most usable product, and, within the limitations of the cardboard, I can't think how they can be much improved." Darvill-Evans concluded his review by saying, "They are sure to become an essential part of every DM's equipment, and at the price are a worthwhile investment."

Doug Cowie reviewed Dungeon Mapping Sheets for Imagine magazine, and stated that "These are intended for larger scale representations than the hex sheets (plans rather than maps) and are likely to be used mainly for dungeons, castles or villages. Until now most people will have used graph paper for these tasks."

Doug Cowie reviewed Dungeon Floor Plans 3 for Imagine magazine, and stated that "this is a good accessory which, if used with more preparation and forethought than the standard floor plans, will enhance the visual appeal of many outdoor adventures."
