= Münsterbildchen =

- part of Roetgen
- Coat of arms
- Interactive map of Münsterbildchen
- Location within Germany Location within North Rhine-Westphalia
- Coordinates: 50°39′24.2″N 6°11′11.9″E
- Country: Germany
- State: North Rhine-Westphalia
- District: Aachen
- Municipality: Roetgen

Area
  - Total: 1.88 km^{2} (0.73 sq mi)
- Elevation: 433 m (1,421 ft)

Population
  - Total: 34
  - Density: 18/km^{2} (47/sq mi)
- Time zone: UTC+01:00 (CET)
  - Summer (DST): UTC+02:00 (CEST)
- Postal codes: 52156
- Vehicle registration: AC, MON

Münsterbildchen is the northernmost German exclave in Belgium. The exclave is mainly composed of commercial buildings and farmland, with a few houses mainly in the south.

== History ==
Prior to becoming an exclave, the area became part of Prussia in 1815, and then part of the German Empire in 1871. The exclave was created, when the ceding of Eupen-Malmedy from the German Empire to Belgium led to the railway Vennbahn crossing in and out of Belgium multiple times. At request of the Belgian government, the territory that the Vennbahn was situated on was made part of Belgium, to allow it to be solely administrated by them. This created six German exclaves in Belgium, of which five still exist. In May 1940, the Eupen-Malmedy area was re-annexed by Nazi Germany under Adolf Hitler, and the area remained again part of Germany until 1945 when the area was returned to Belgium, making Münsterbildchen an exclave again. The Vennbahn railway line no longer exists, and a cycling path was built in its place during the 2010s.

== Points of interest ==
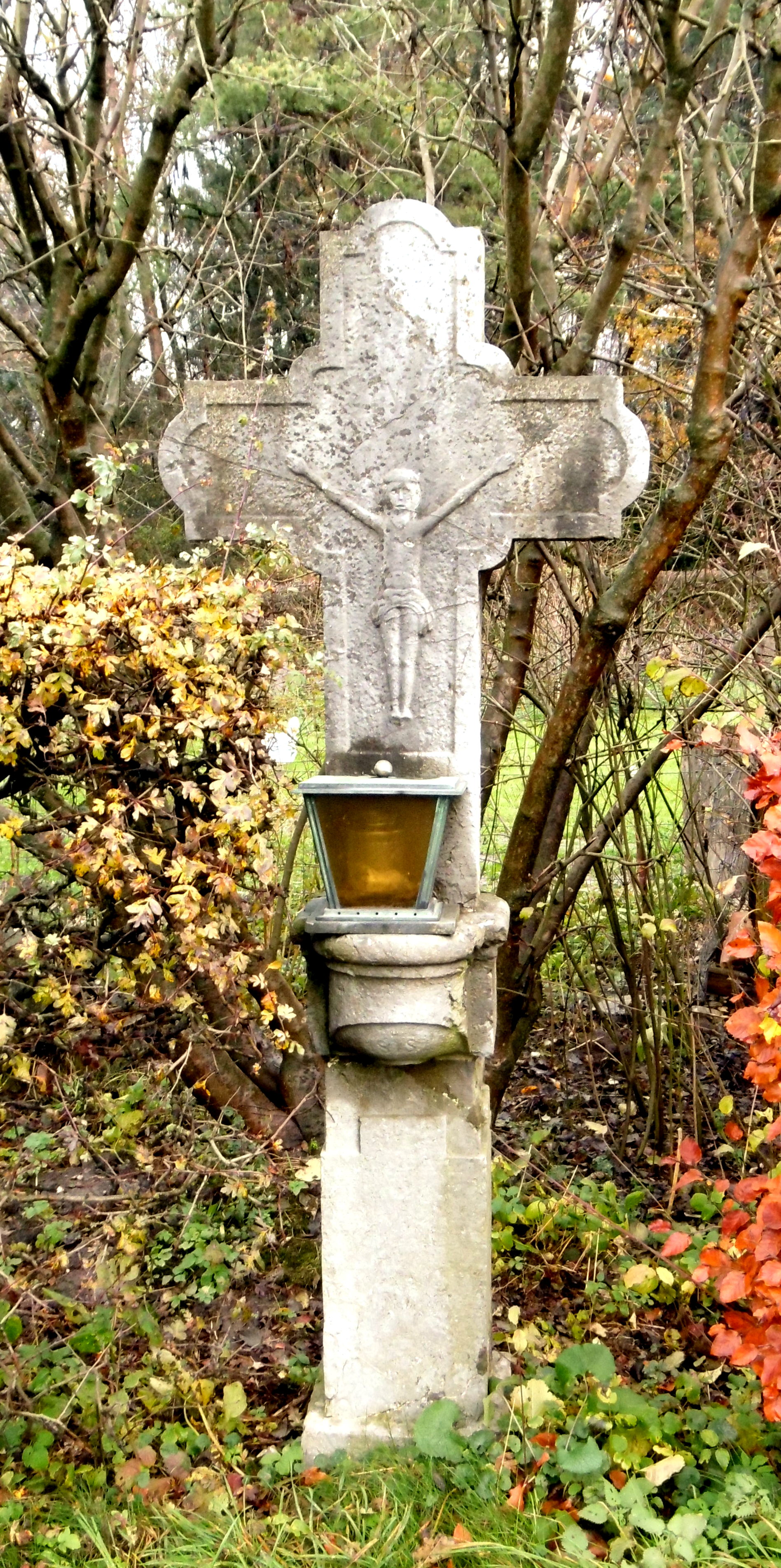
Münsterbildchen wayside cross

- Genagelte Stein or Nailed Stone, along the banks of the Grölisbach, a small stream that flows through the exclave, lies a stone with three nails in it, used to mark the original border between the Kornelimünster Abbey, Duchy of Jülich, and the Duchy of Limburg in the Holy Roman Empire.
- Münsterbildchen wayside cross, built in 1818 using bluestone coming from Münsterland in Germany.
- Besides being a primarily industrial area, Münsterbildchen also hosts a pizzeria, a hotel, and a bus station.

== See also ==
- Enclave and exclave
