= Kornelimünster/Walheim =

- Borough of Aachen
- Interactive map of Kornelimünster/Walheim
- Location within Germany Location within North Rhine-Westphalia
- Coordinates: 50°43′17″N 6°10′49″E
- Country: Germany
- State: North Rhine-Westphalia
- District: Urban district
- City: Aachen

Area
  - Total: 37.03 km^{2} (14.30 sq mi)
- Elevation: 240 m (790 ft)

Population (2020-12-31)
  - Total: 15,289
  - Density: 412.9/km^{2} (1,069/sq mi)
- Time zone: UTC+01:00 (CET)
  - Summer (DST): UTC+02:00 (CEST)
- Postal codes: 52076

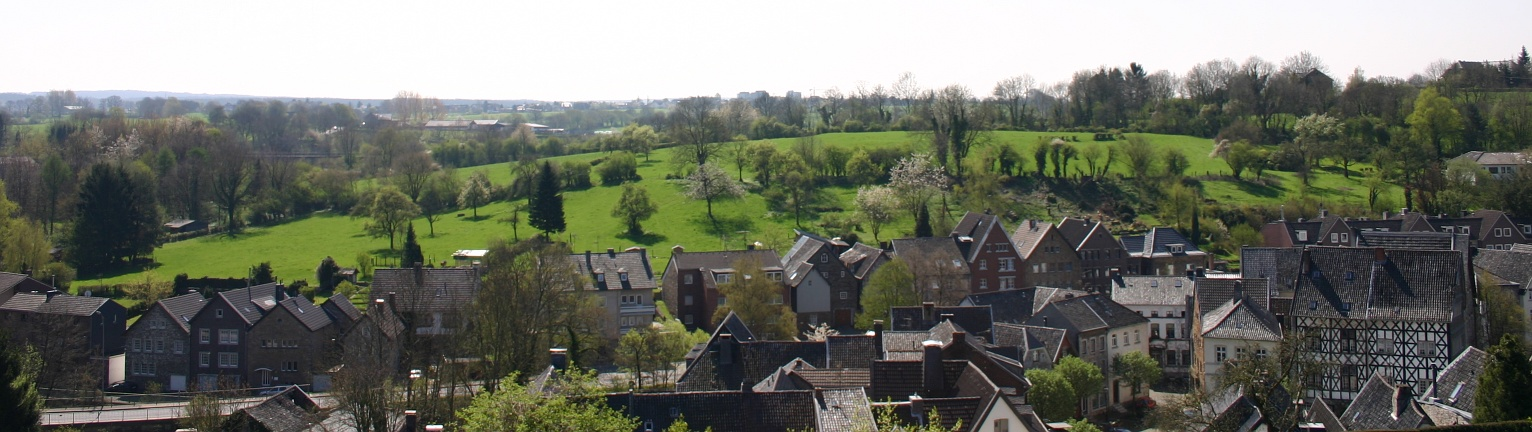
View of Kornelimünster, with Walheim on the horizon

Kornelimünster/Walheim is the southernmost Stadtbezirk (borough) of Aachen, Germany, and borders the Eifel area of North Rhine-Westphalia, as well as Belgium. It became part of Aachen in 1972, after all of the communities surrounding the city were reorganized administratively. The countryside is called Münsterländchen.

== Communities ==
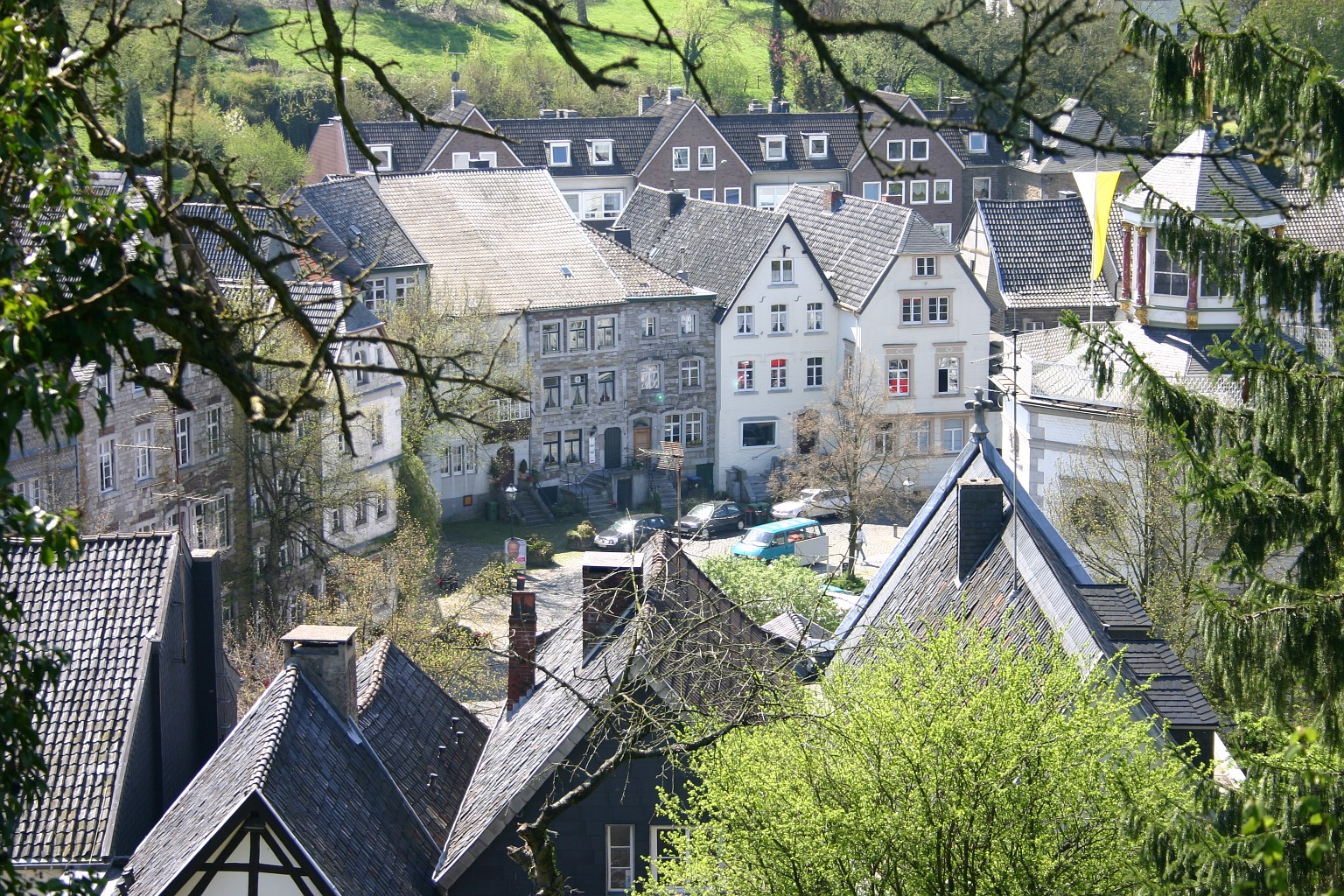
Kornelimünster

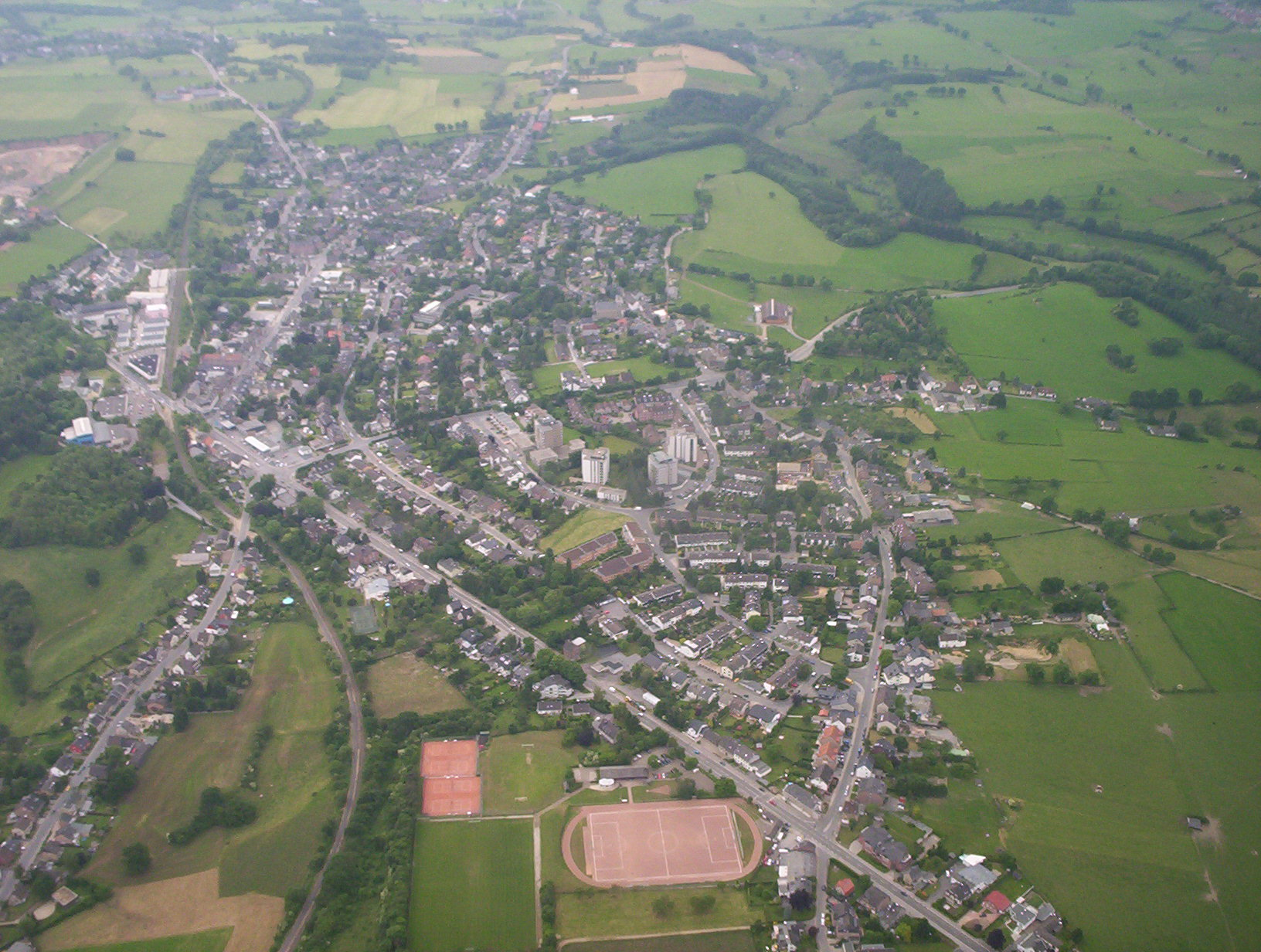
Aerial view of Walheim, 2005

- Kornelimünster, Administrative seat of the district, with historic town center
- Walheim, central business area of the district, and its largest community
- Friesenrath, on the border with the Eifel community of Roetgen
- Hahn, on the Inde River
- Lichtenbusch, German-Belgian border town with a border crossing for A44/E40
- Nütheim
- Oberforstbach, including an industrial park on Pascalstraße (especially for businesses specializing in information technology)
- Schleckheim
- Schmithof on the Vennbahn
- Sief, with border crossing to Raeren (Belgium)
- Eich

=== Pictures ===
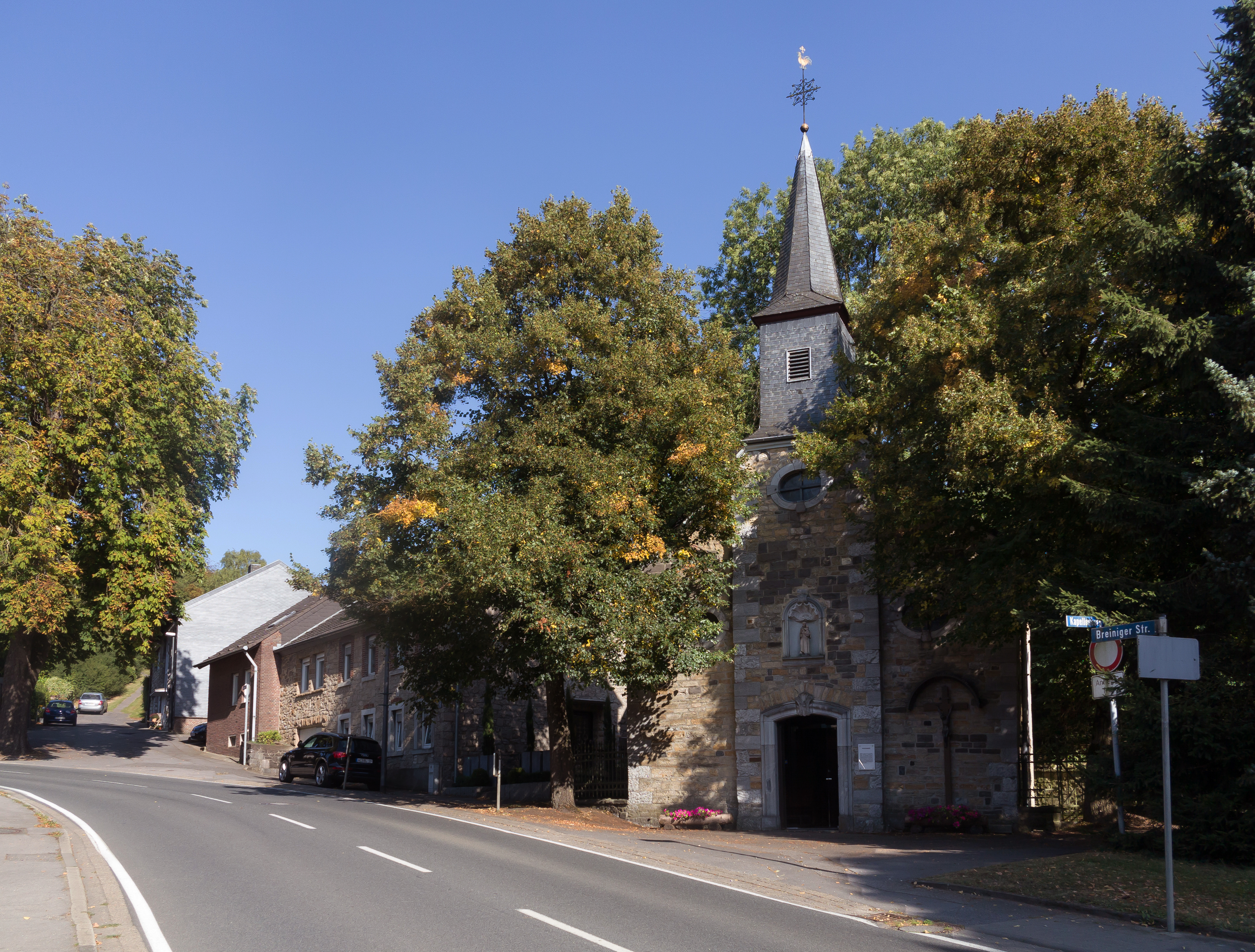
Chapel in Kornelimünster

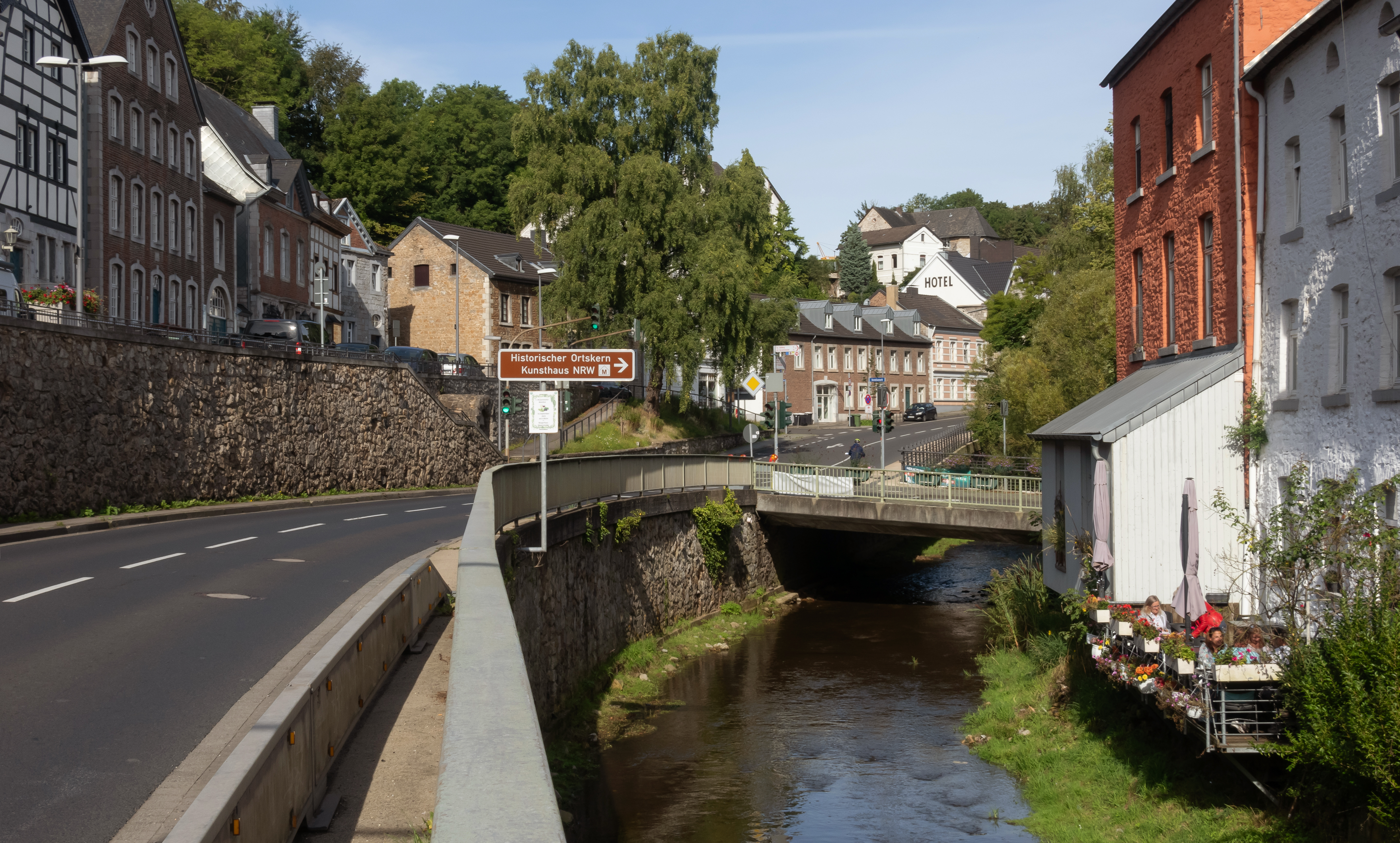
Kornelimünster, street view Napoleonsberg

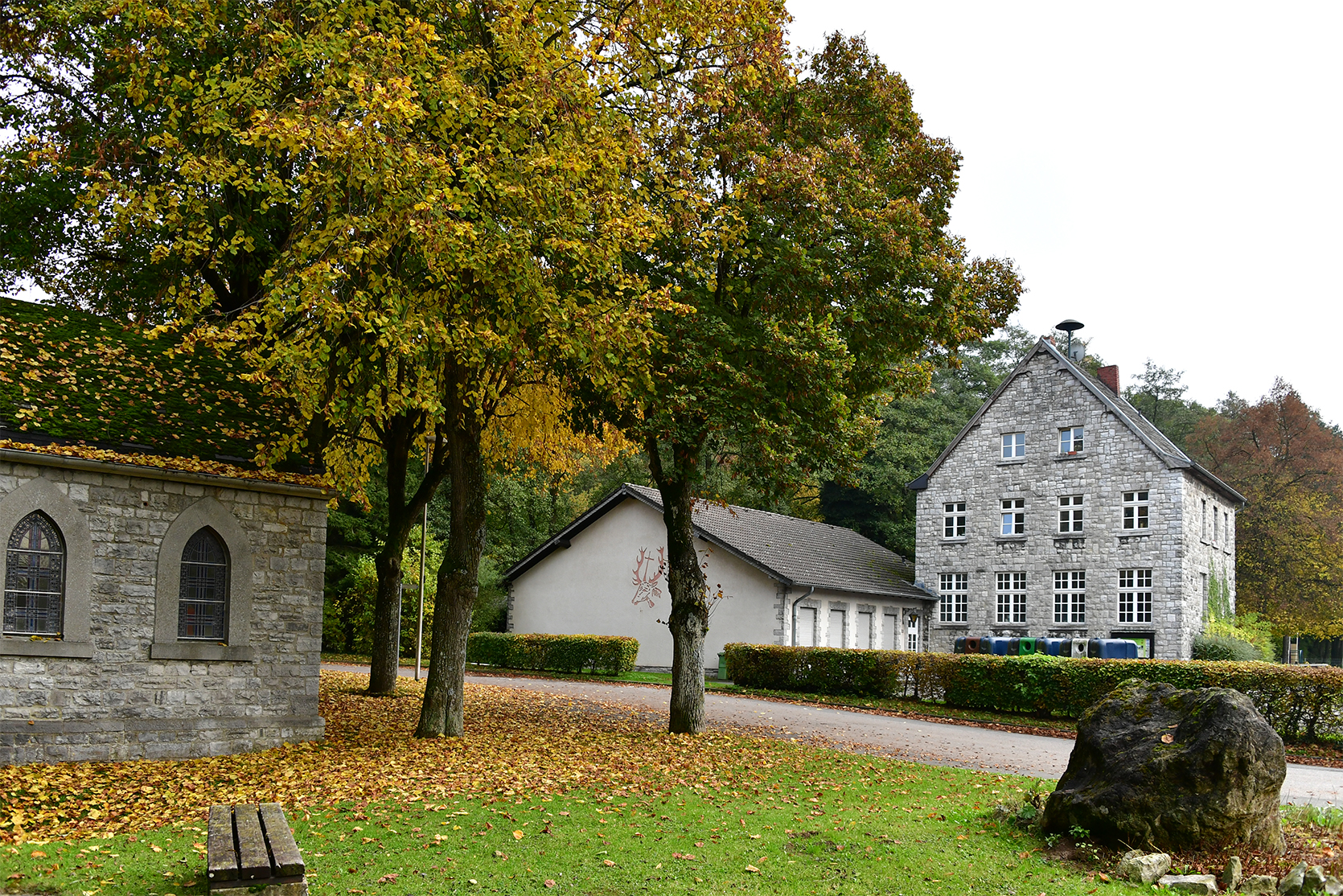
Streetview of Friesenrath

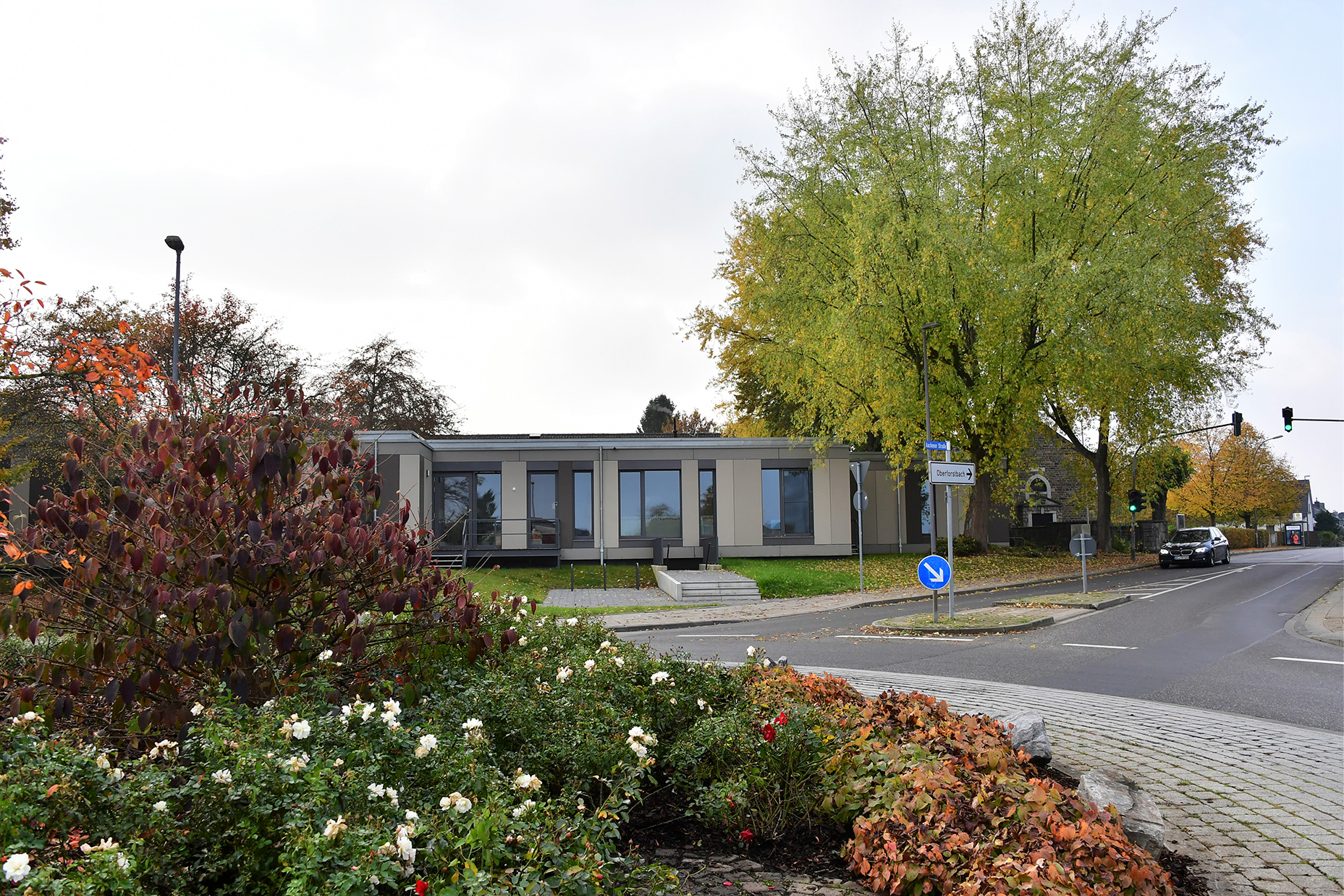
Streetview of Schleckheim

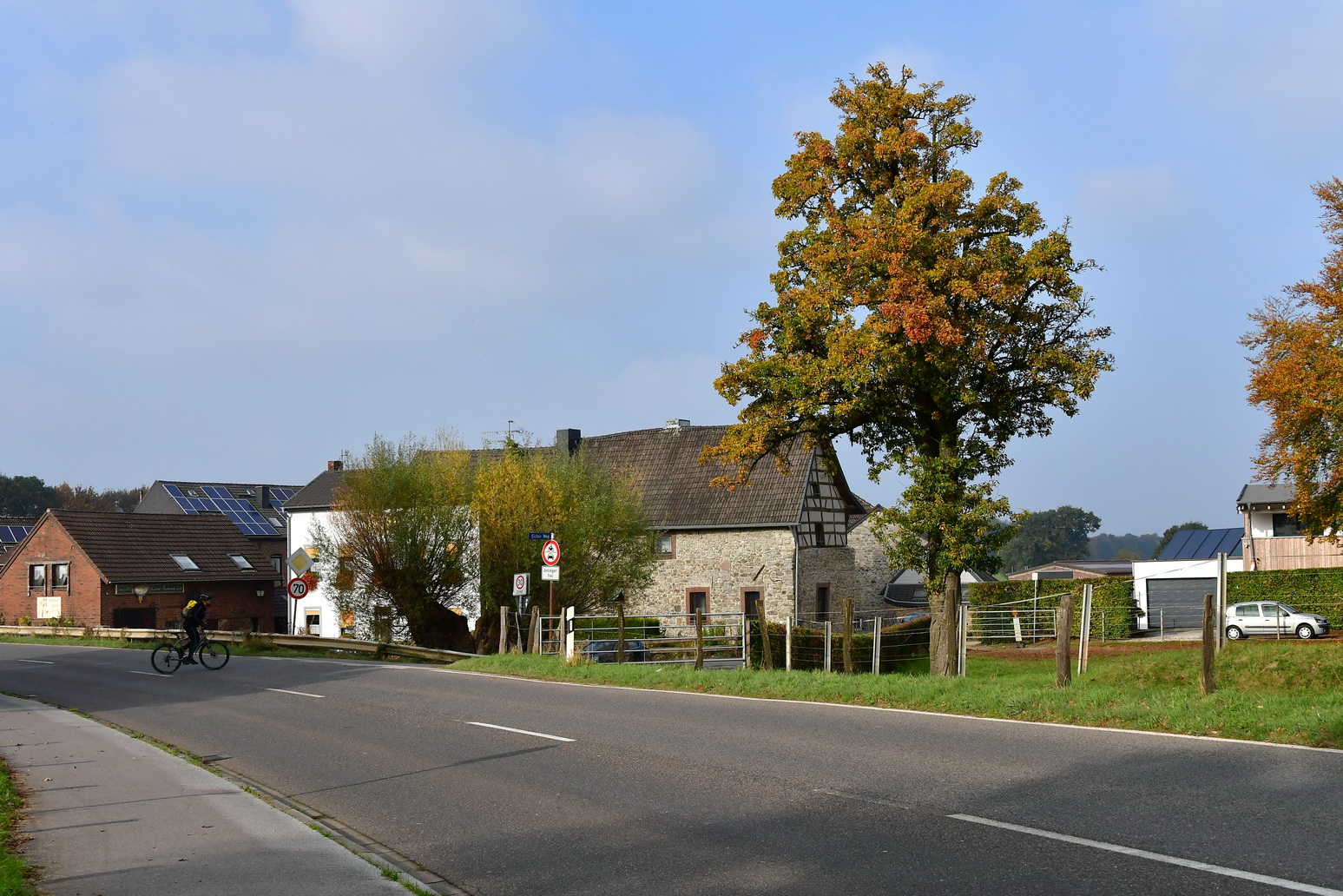
Streetview of Eich

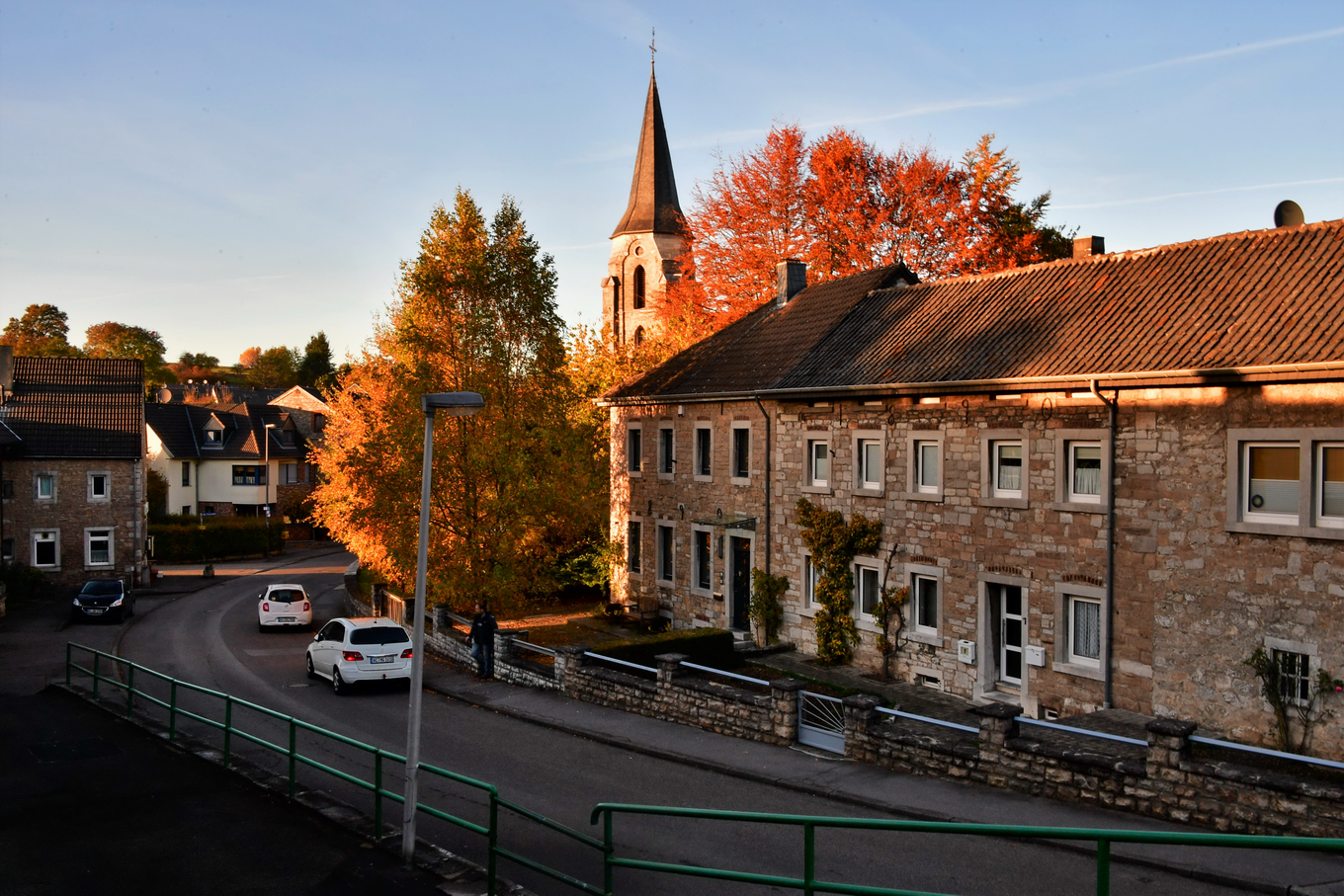
Streetview of Hahn

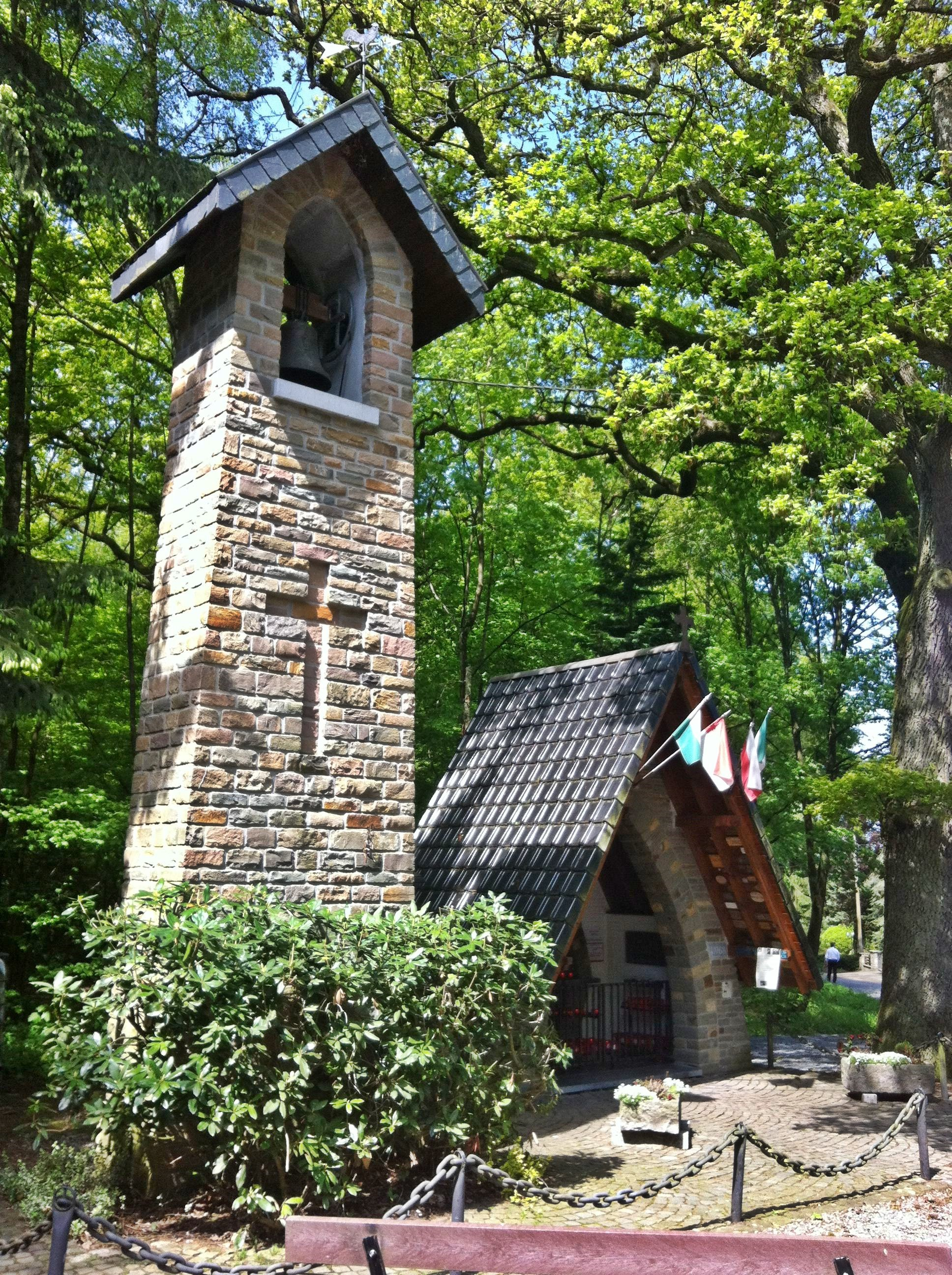
Streetview of Lichtenbusch

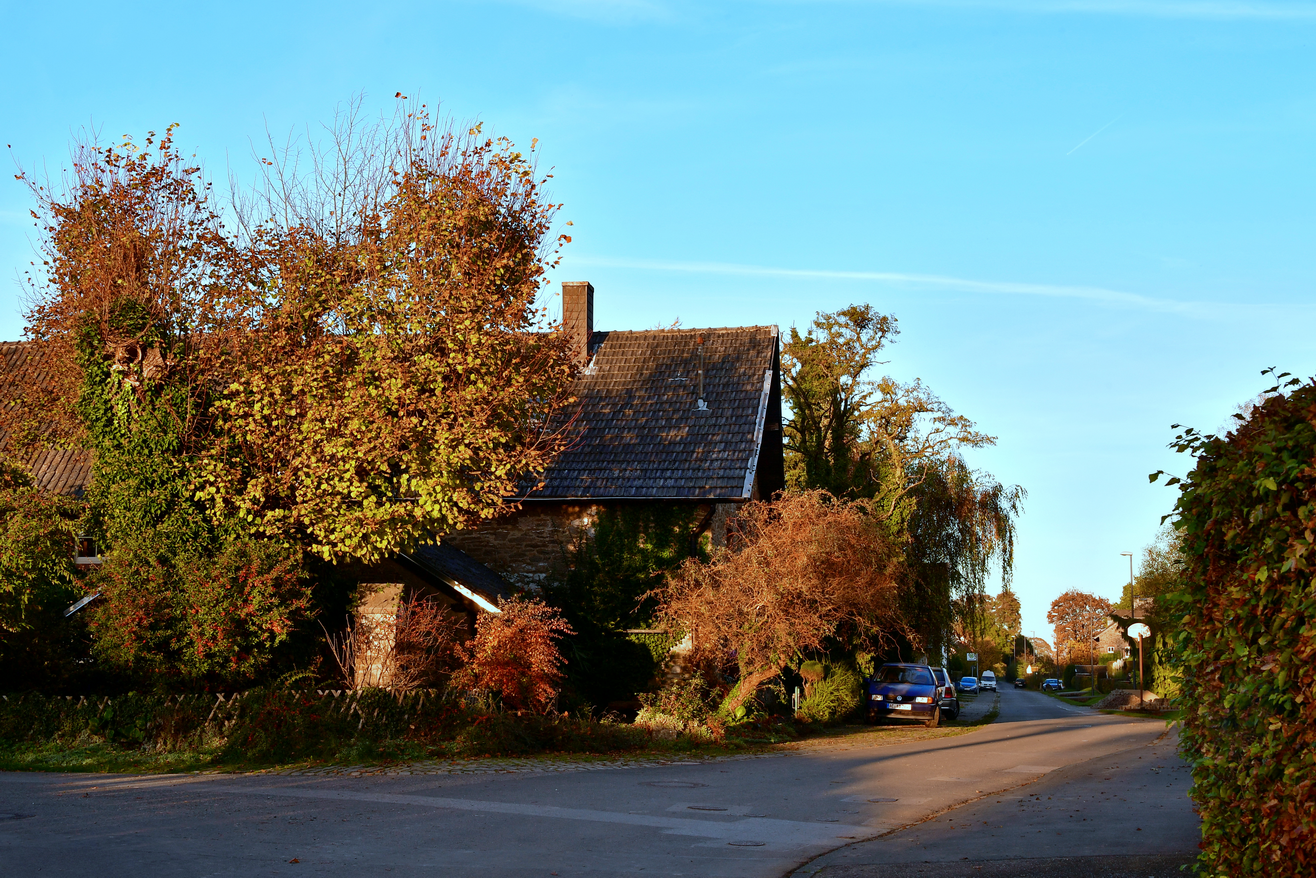
Streetview of Nütheim

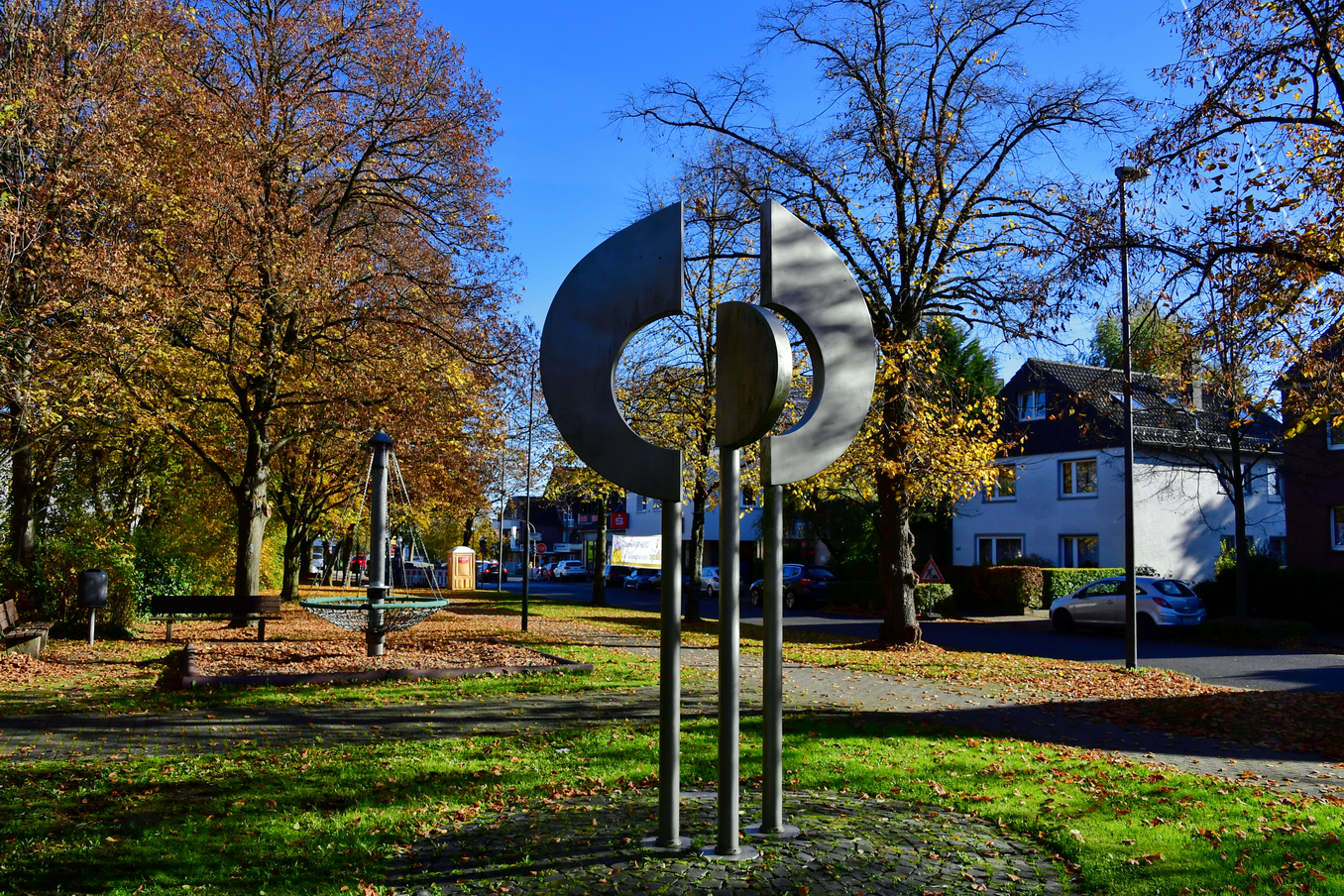
Streetview of Oberforstbach

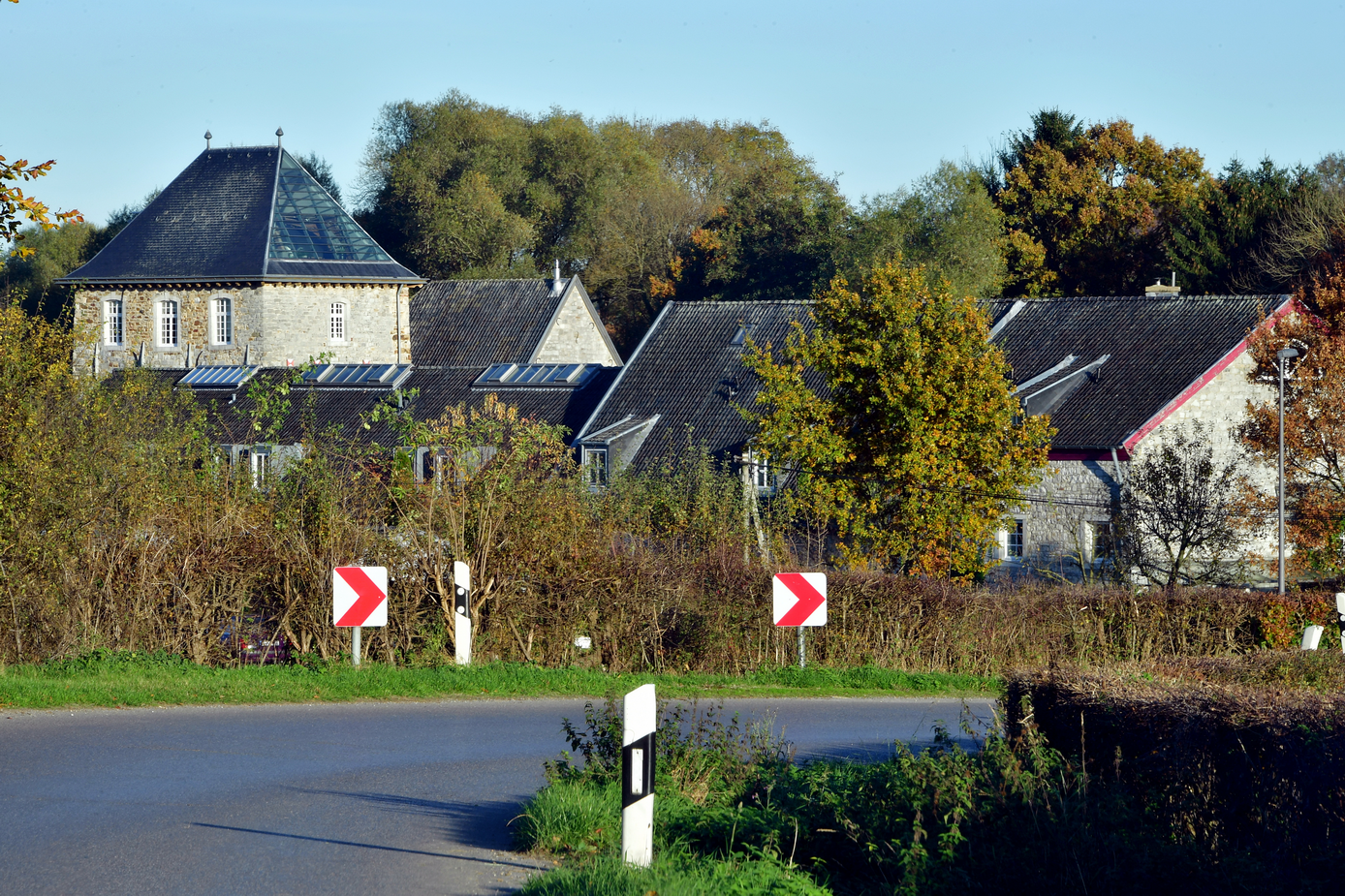
Streetview of Sief

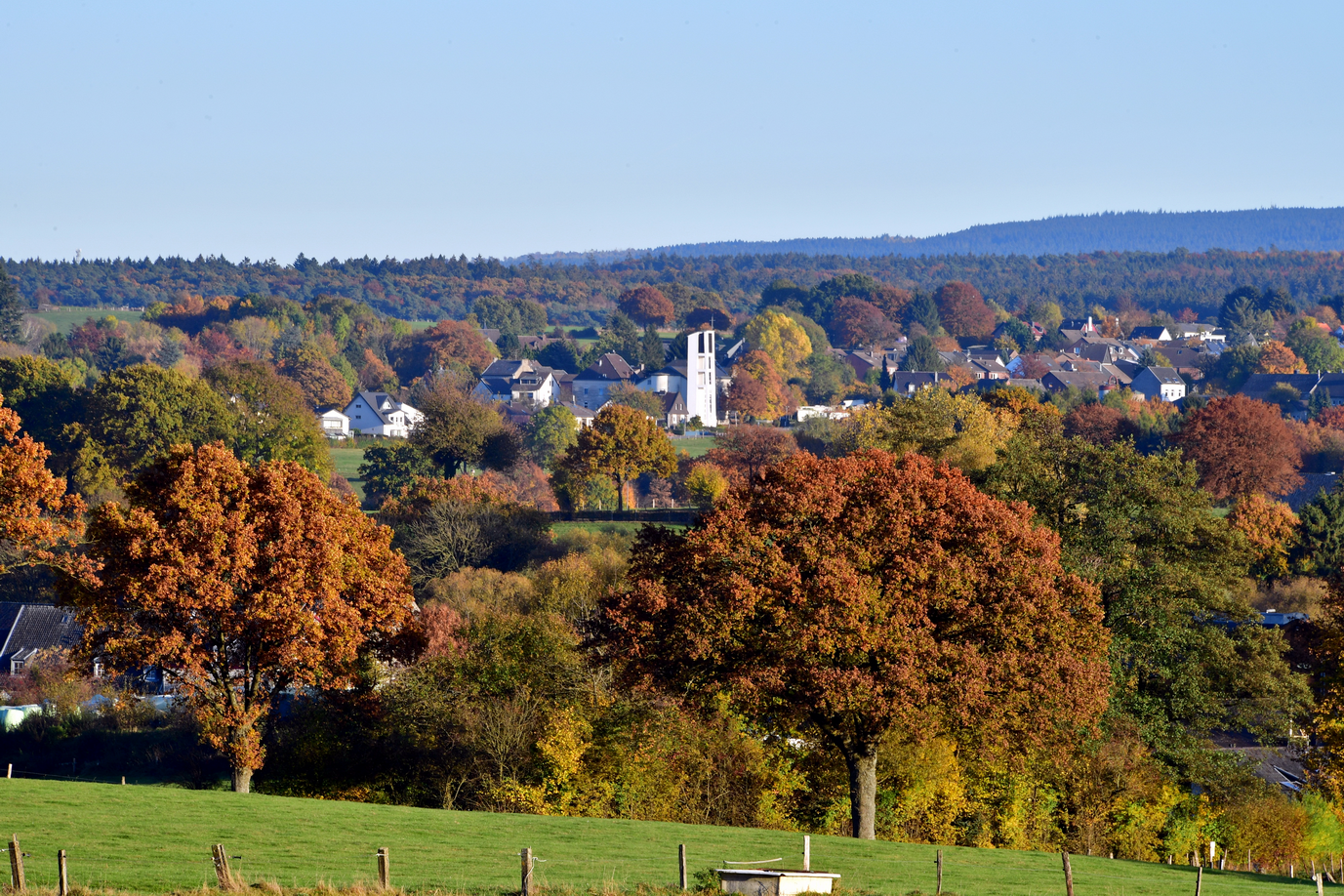
View of Schmithof

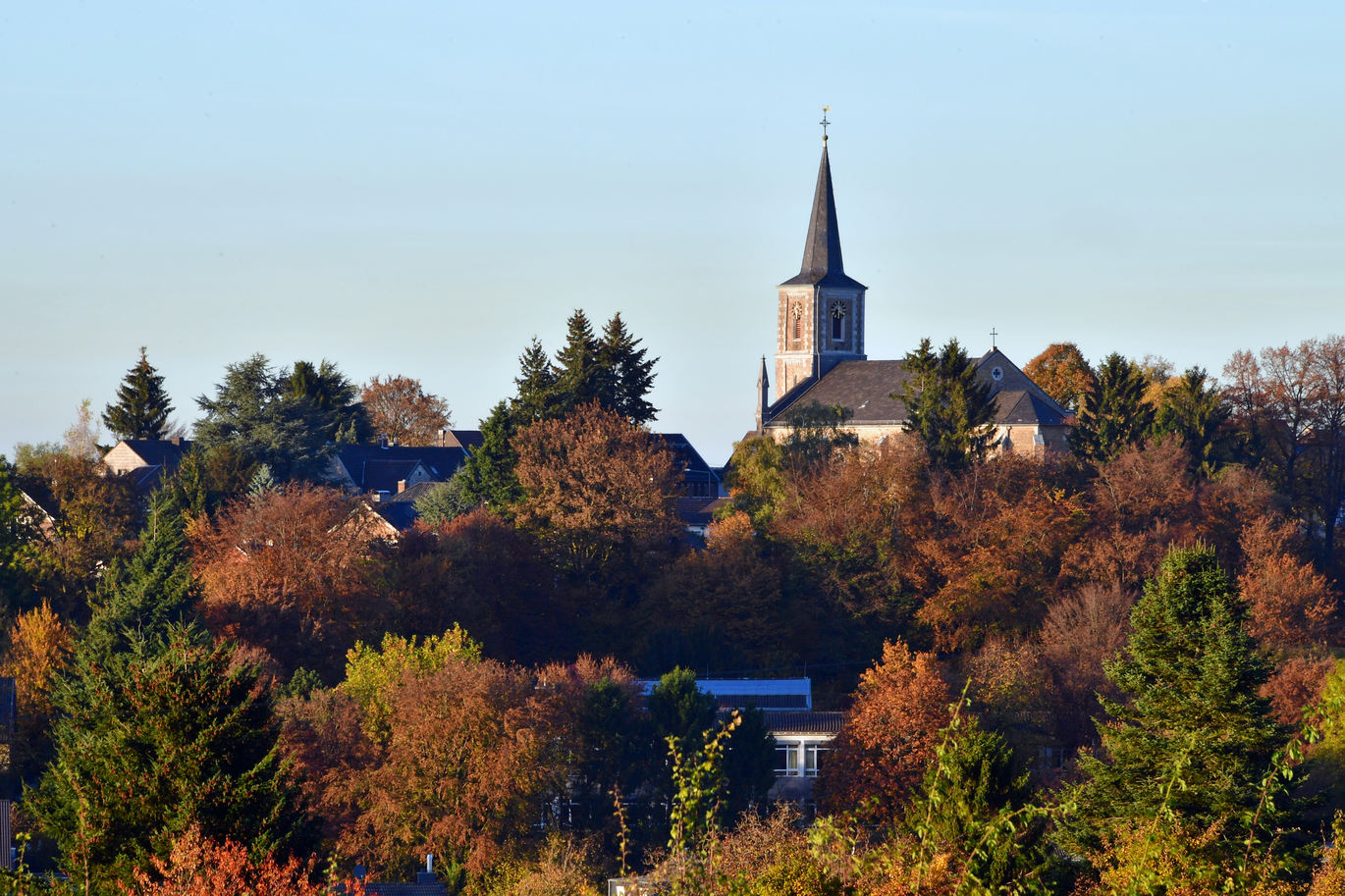
Walheim church

== Landmarks/Attractions ==
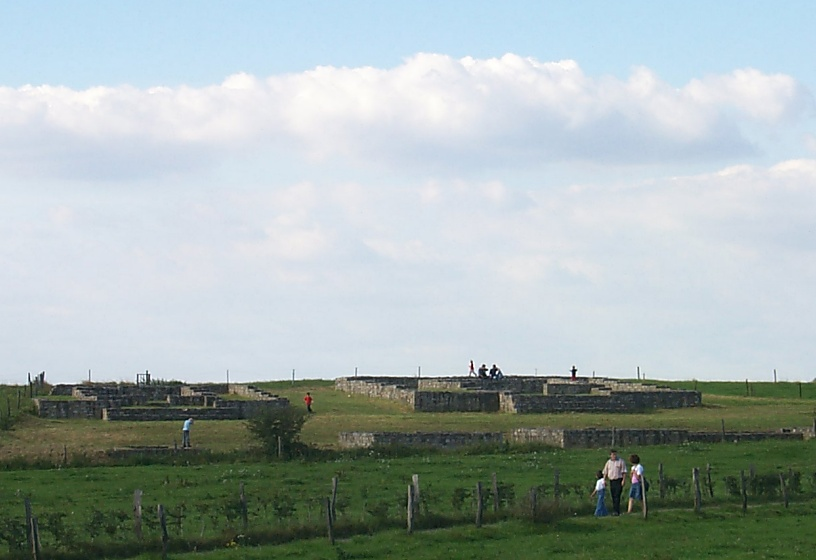
the Varnenum, an excavated temple complex from the Gallo-Roman era

- Kornelimünster's historic city center, with timber-framed structures on the Inde River
- former Kornelimünster Abbey, now the site of the Art of NRW, which is open to the public
- Kornelimünster Abbey gardens
- Provost Kornelimünster Church (originally from 814 to 817 AD)
- Varnenum - Excavations at Kornelimünster of a Gallo-Roman temple system
- former quarry and lime kiln in Walheim and Hahn (with posted information boards)
- Former quarry in Walheim now a large public space with playgrounds, minigolf, barbecue facilities and access to the Vennbahn path
- Historic landmark, St. Stephanus Church and cemetery
- Historic landmark, Maria in the Snow Chapel
- St. Anthony-Chapel, a small church that was destroyed in an earthquake and rebuilt in the 18th century
- Iter and Inde valley

== Events ==
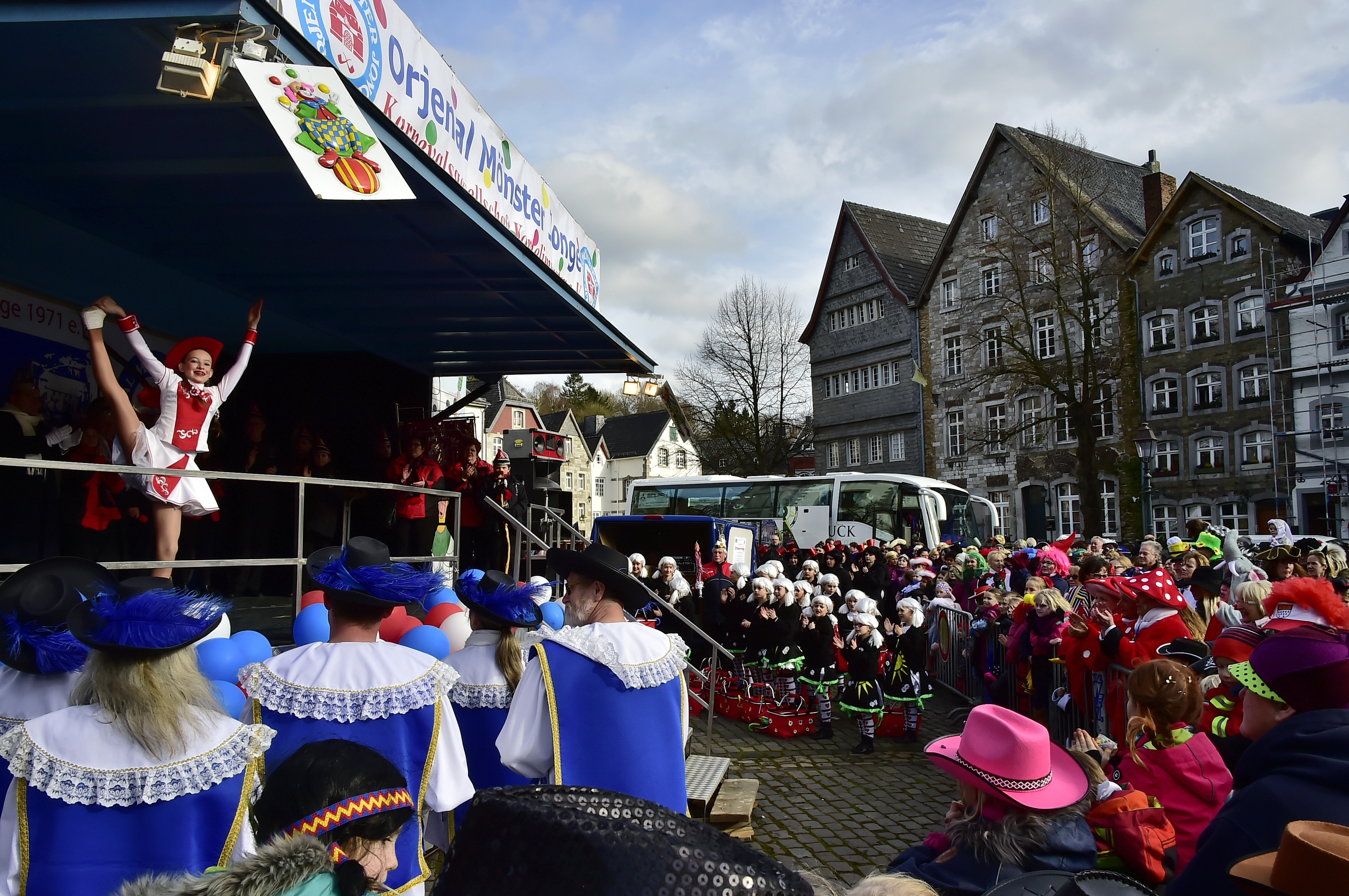
Open air carnival Kornelimünster

- Historical fairground (Kornelimünster)
- Thanksgiving (Walheim)
- Carnival (Lichtenbusch/Oberforstbach)
- Open air carnival (Kornelimünster)
- Festival of stars (Schleckheim)

== Twin towns and sister cities ==
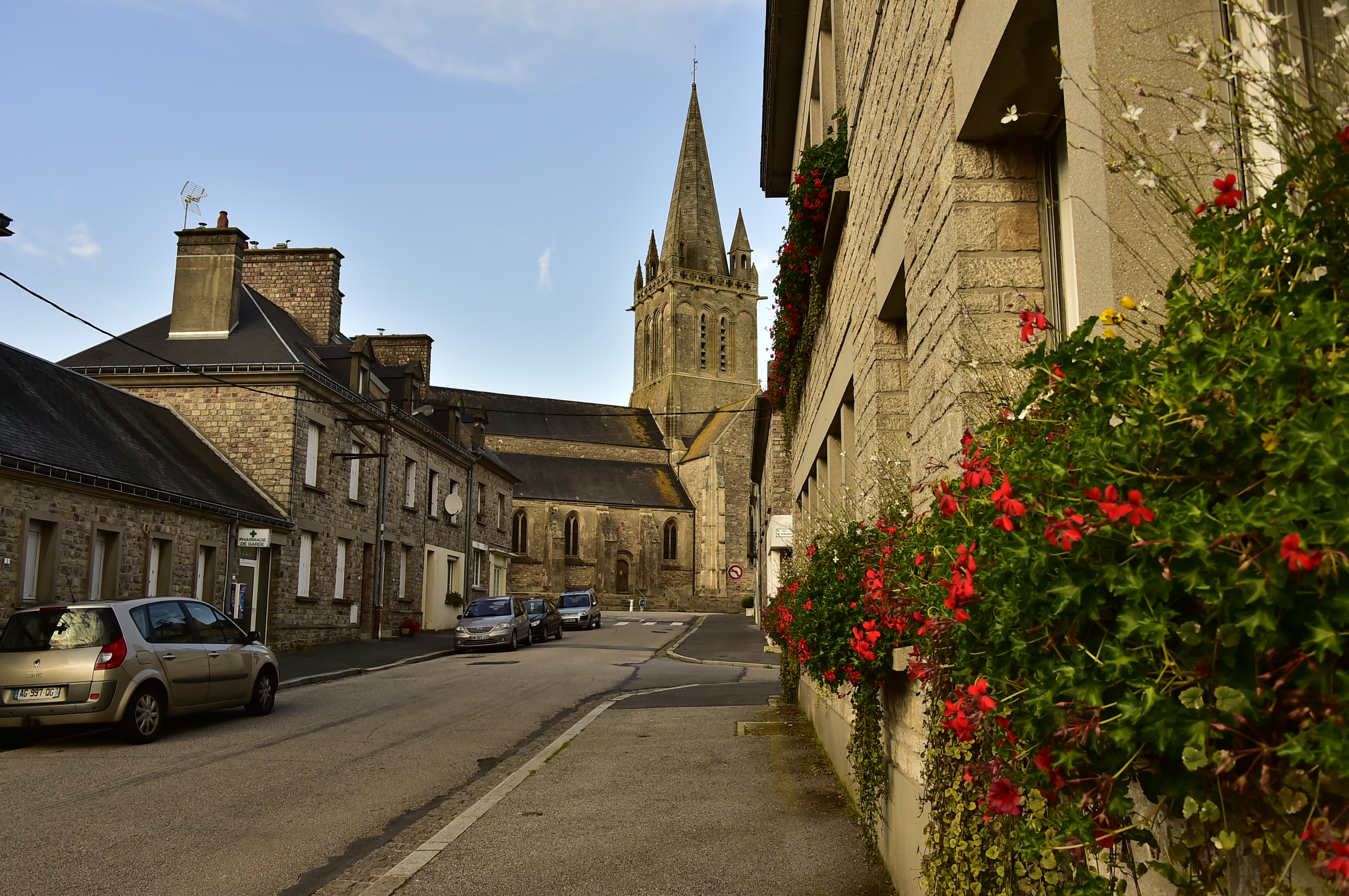
Montebourg - L'église Saint-Jacques

- Montebourg (France), a sister city of Walheim since 1960, which was carried over to the district after Kornelimünster and Walheim were merged in 1972. Montebourg is a commune in the Manche department (Basse-Normandie) in Normandy in north-western France. It is located southeast of Cherbourg.
