= St. Anthony's Chapel, Aachen =

Church in Aachen, Germany

Coordinates: 50°43′41″N 6°11′18″E

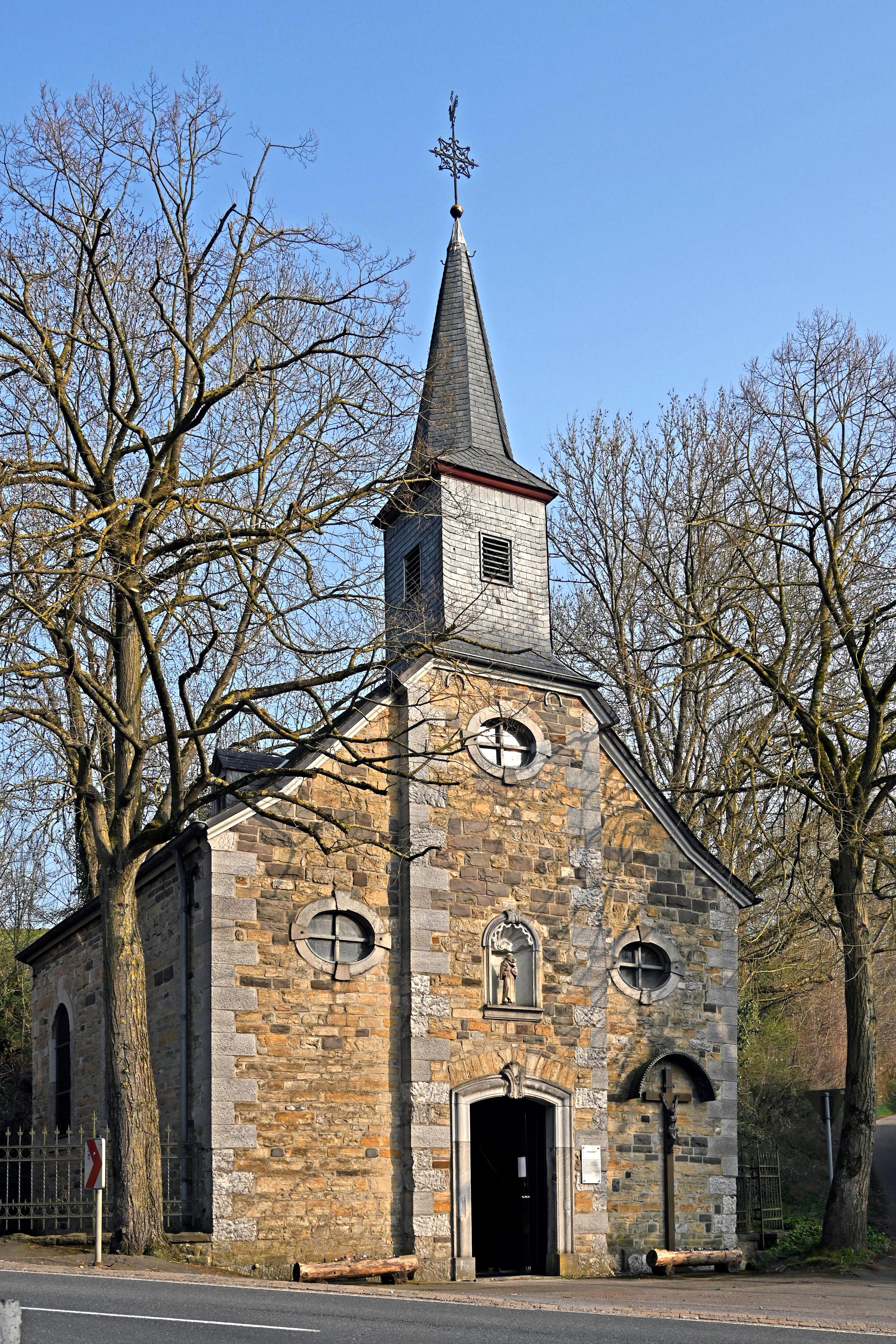
St. Anthony-Chapel

St. Anthony's Chapel (German: Antoniuskapelle) is located in Kornelimünster/Walheim, a district of the German city of Aachen.

The chapel was built in 1718 but destroyed by an earthquake before consecration. Charles Ludwig von Sickingen-Ebernburg, the abbot of the abbey at Kornelimünster later ordered to rebuild the damaged unfinished building. The work was completed in 1781 and the chapel consecrated in the same year to Anthony of Padua by the administrator of the abbey Charles Caspar von der Horst.

The St. Anthony-Chapel is part of a circle of five chapels built around the abbey as the central church of Kornelimünster.
