= Finkelsbach =

River in Germany

Location
- Country: Germany
- State: North Rhine-Westphalia

Physical characteristics
- Mouth
  - location: Inde
  - coordinates: 50.8184°N 6.2398°E

Basin features
- Progression: Inde→ Rur→ Meuse→ North Sea

The Finkelsbach is a small stream in Eschweiler, North Rhine-Westphalia, Germany. It is 1.1 km long and is a left tributary of the Inde.

The river rises within the former Belgian military camp Astrid in the Propsteier Wald. From there it flows through parts of the intensively agriculturally used areas Northwest of Röhe. Water from small sources in the surrounding fields is led into the Finkelsbach. It passes along the foot of the Ellerberg and takes up tributaries from the Propsteier Wald. This area is called popularly Hötter Bösch, Standard German Hütter Wald, due to the former copper mill which was operated by the Finkelsbach. In the past, there were botanically interesting wetlands around here. The last part of the Finkelsbach is largely channeled underground. It joins the Inde between Röhe and Aue.

== See also ==
- List of rivers of North Rhine-Westphalia
