= Kornelimünster =

- Stadtteil of Aachen
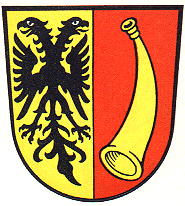
- Coat of arms
- Interactive map of Kornelimünster
- Location within Germany Location within North Rhine-Westphalia
- Coordinates: 50°43′43″N 6°10′41″E
- Country: Germany
- State: North Rhine-Westphalia
- City: Aachen
- Borough: Kornelimünster/Walheim

Area
  - Total: 4.48 km^{2} (1.73 sq mi)
- Elevation: 235 m (771 ft)

Population (2020-12-31)
  - Total: 3,236
  - Density: 722/km^{2} (1,870/sq mi)
- Time zone: UTC+01:00 (CET)
  - Summer (DST): UTC+02:00 (CEST)
- Postal codes: 52076

Kornelimünster (Kölsch: Mönster) is a town in the rural Münsterländchen area of Kornelimünster/Walheim, a district of Aachen, Germany.

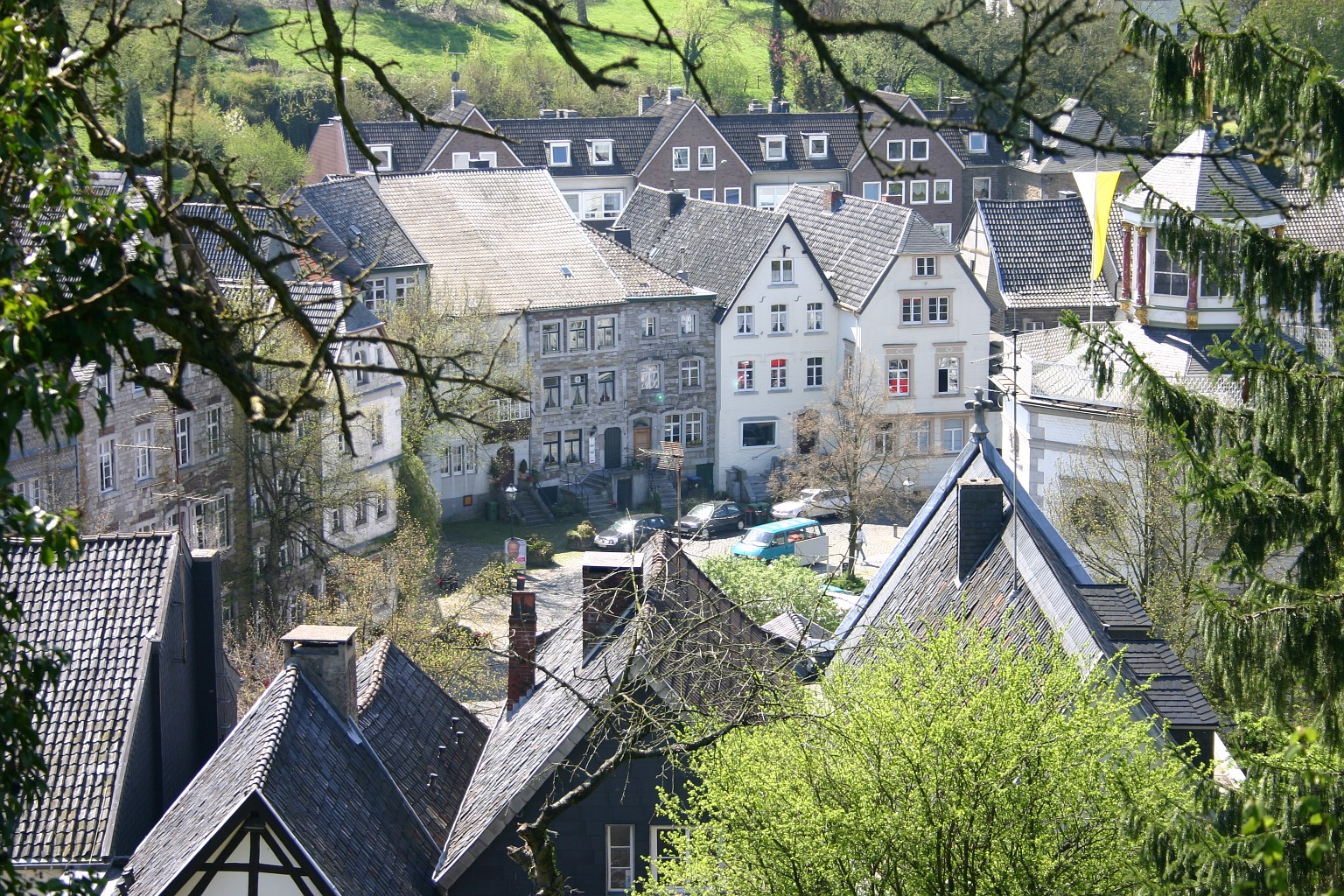
Historic town center

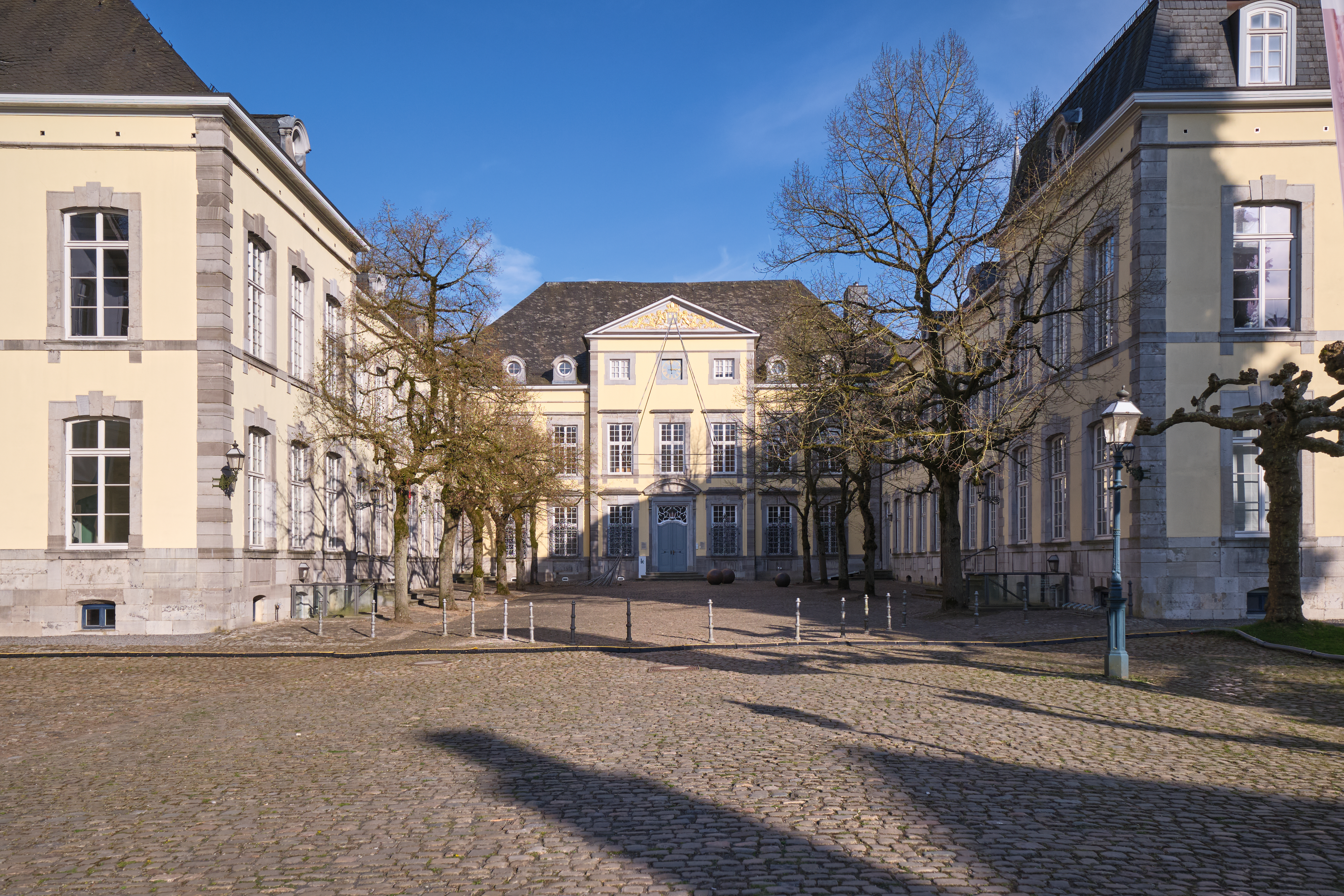
Kornelimünster Abbey

== History ==
Roman presence is evidenced by the discovery of a Gallo-Roman temple complex 1907.

The Kornelimünster Abbey was founded in 814 on the Inde River by Benedict of Aniane (750–821), at the suggestion of Louis the Pious, son and successor of Charlemagne. The cloister was originally called Redeemer Cloister on the Inde (Erlöserkloster an der Inde).

In the middle of the 9th century, the cloister was given imperial immediacy and subsequently came into possession of a large swath of area surrounding the church.

In 875, certain reliquaries were exchanged for one belonging to the martyr saint, Pope Cornelius (who died in 253). The cloister thereafter became known as Sancti Cornelii ad Indam (St Cornelius on the Inde), and then Kornelimünster. Today, the official title of the abbey is the Abbey of St Benedict of Aniane and Pope Cornelius.

In 1500 the abbey became part of the Lower Rhenish–Westphalian Circle, and in 1802, the area fell to the French. Along with other abbeys in French controlled areas, the abbey at Kornelimünster was abolished and the monks were forced to leave. During this time, the community of Kornelimünster came under administration of the French, under the Mairie system. In 1815 Prussia came into possession of Kornelimünster and was subsequently administered as part of the old district of Aachen (before the administrative restructuring of 1972). Benedictine monks returned to the Kornelimünster Abbey in 1906 to found the New Benedictine Kornelimünster Abbey. The St Cornelius Church of the former abbey is today the parish church of the community and is the oldest abbey building still used in the state of North Rhine-Westphalia.

During World War II U.S. forces reached the area south of Aachen in the fall of 1944. On 19 September Kornelimünster was captured without major damage. The first summary court in Germany during World War II opened in Kornelimünster late in September.

In 1971 Kornelimünster joined together with other area communities such as Breinig, Mulartshütte, Roetgen, Venwegen and Walheim to argue in favor of creating a Münsterland district. Instead, on 1 January 1972, the area was divided as follows: the Kornelimünster and Walheim communities were combined into the Kornelimünster/Walheim district of Aachen, while Breinig and Venwegen went to Stolberg. The remaining communities of Mulartshütte, Rott and Roetgen were combined into the Roetgen district.

== Pilgrimage ==
The parish church of St. Cornelius remains a destination for pilgrimages.

== Politics ==
=== Mayors ===
- 1945–1952: Karl Siemons
- 1952–1956: Viktor Hoven, FDP
- 1969–1971: Egon von Reth

== Traffic ==
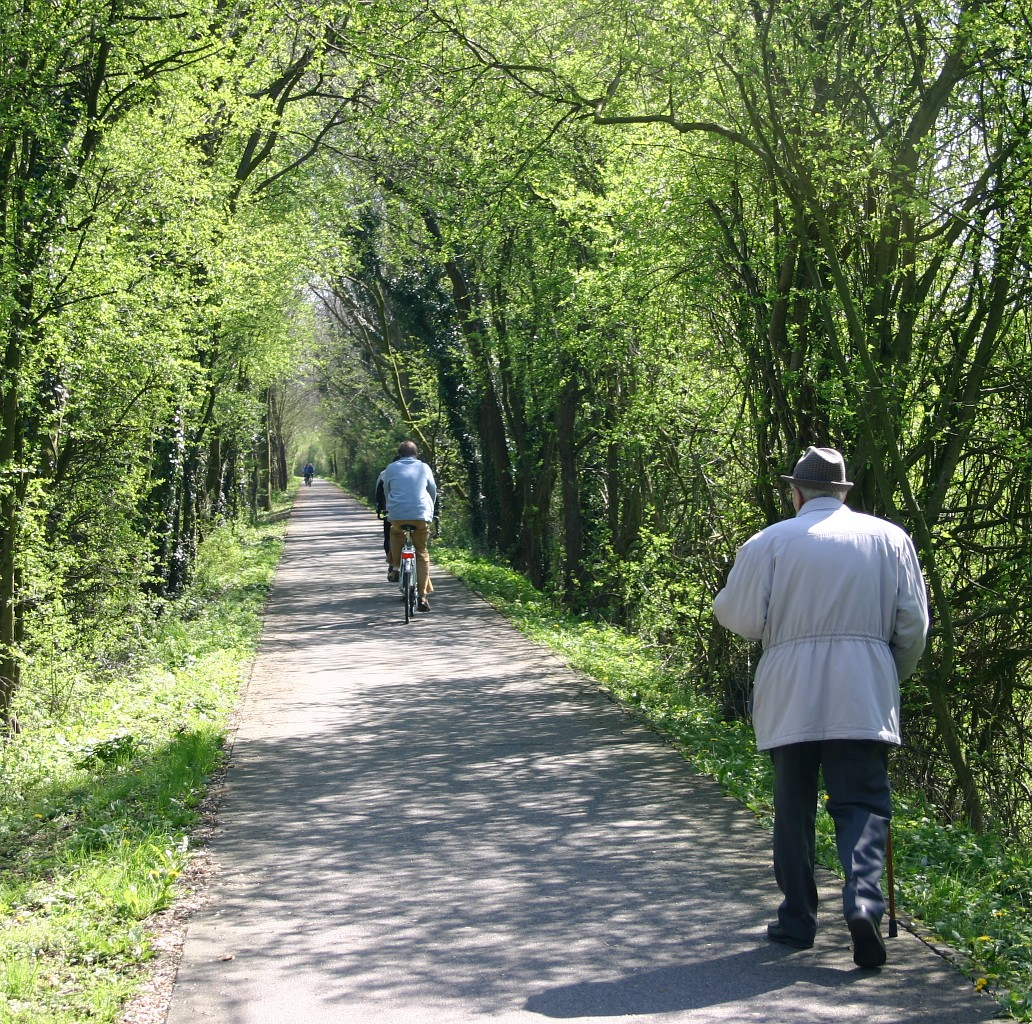
The Vennbahn bike path

Kornelimünster no longer lies along the Bundesstraße 258, which connected Aachen to the Eifel. The nearest onramp of the Autobahn 44 (E40) is in Brand, another district of Aachen. Kornelimünster is, however, reachable by bicycle along the Vennbahn bike path.

== Notable persons ==
- Johann Josef Brammertz (1668–1729), organ builder
- Hubert Giesen (1898–1980), Pianist
- Viktor Hoven (1909–1968), Politician (FDP), Member of Parliament (Bundestag), Member of Parliament (Landtag)

== Nearby towns ==
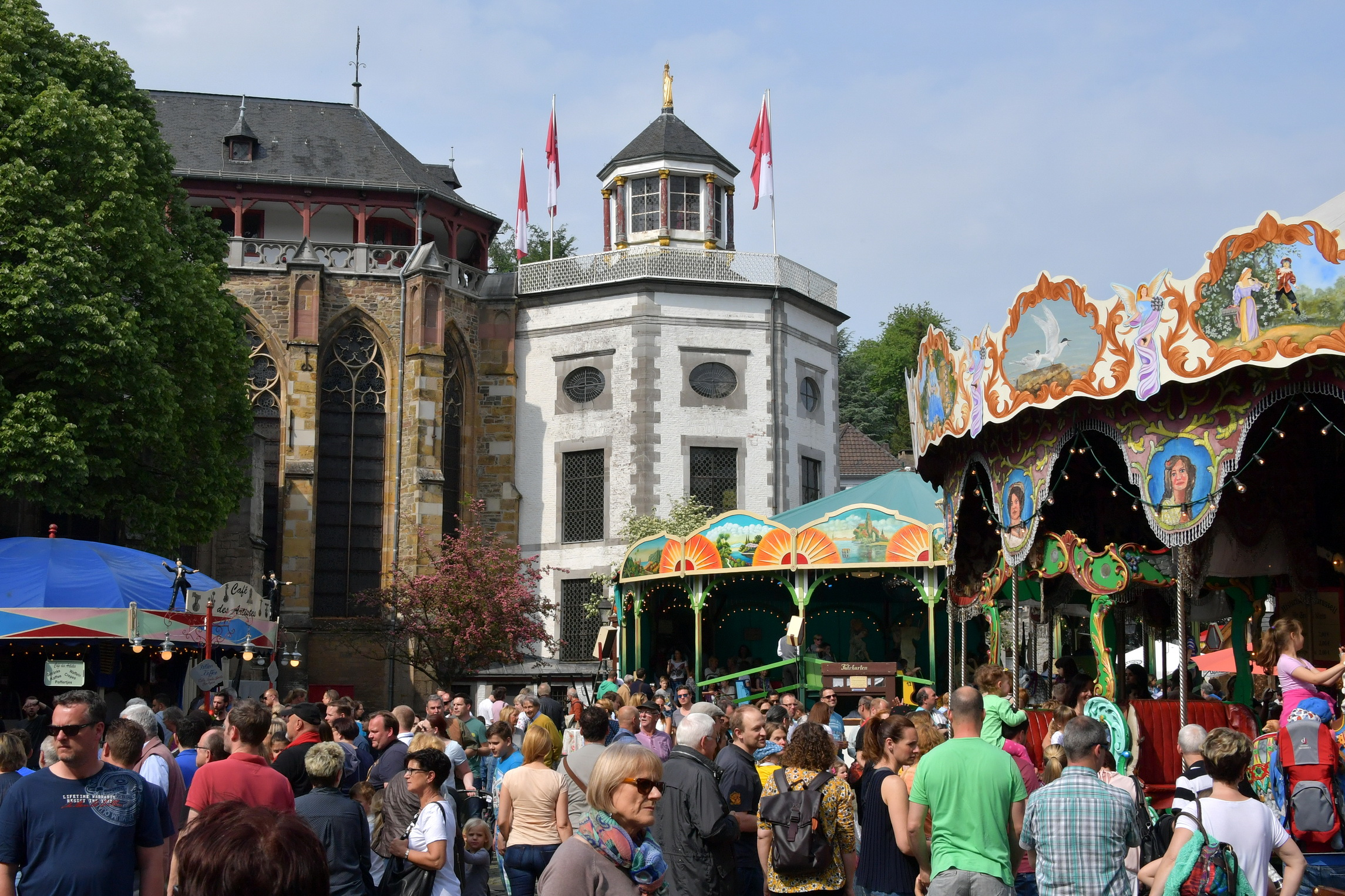
Historical fairs

- Oberforstbach
- Brand
- Schleckheim
- Breinig
- Venwegen
- Walheim
- Nütheim
- Dorff

== Regular events ==
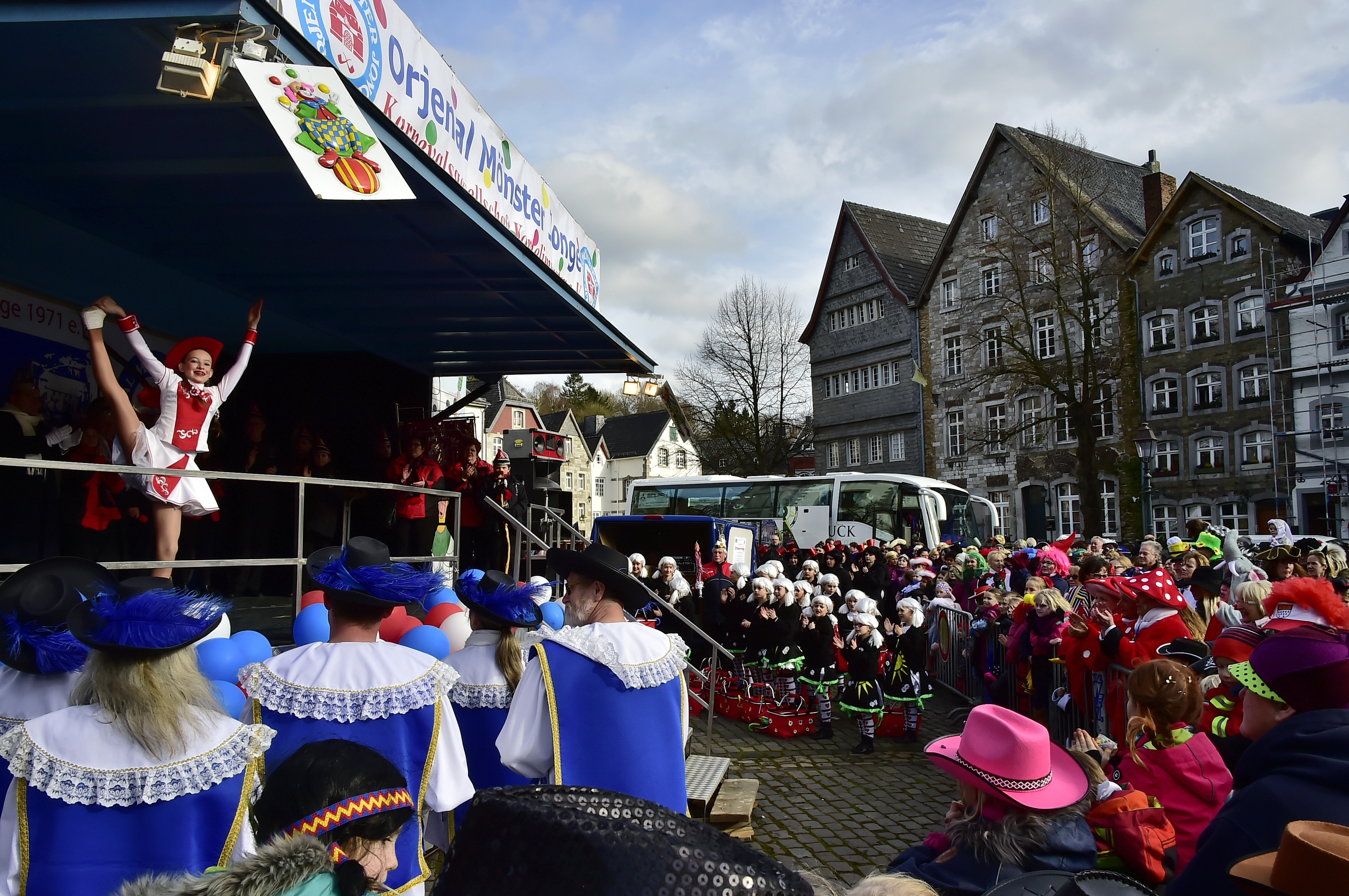
Open-air Carnival

- Open-air carnival
- Christmas market
- Historical fairs

== Works cited ==
- Die Heiligthumsfahrt zu Cornelimünster : eine Festgabe für die frommen Wallfahrer zu derselben. Urlichs, Aachen 1860 (Digitized)
