= Friesenrath =

- Village of Aachen
- Interactive map of Friesenrath
- Location within Germany Location within North Rhine-Westphalia
- Coordinates: 50°41′40″N 06°11′01″E
- Country: Germany
- State: North Rhine-Westphalia
- District: Aachen
- City: Aachen
- Elevation: 272–284 m (892–932 ft)
- Time zone: UTC+01:00 (CET)
  - Summer (DST): UTC+02:00 (CEST)
- Postal codes: 52076
- Dialling codes: 02408

Friesenrath is a small historic village in western Germany, near the spa town Aachen and the tri-border region to Belgium and the Netherlands. Friesenrath is located in the valley of the creek Inde at the edge of the low mountain range Eifel, 11 km southeast of the centre of Aachen. There are several evidences that the village was founded under the rule of the Romans more than one and a half millennium ago. Worth seeing is the chapel St. Bernhard, the castle Friesenrath, the soldiers' monument, a rebuilt drinking water supply with a stone trough and a slaughter site, a milepost and the old school at the center.

== History ==
Probably there stood on the territory of the village a Roman Watchtower, as suggested by several findings. The first mention was made on 10 November 1334 as the original name Vreyssenroide. During the French occupation it belonged to the Mairie Walheim, and later to the municipality in the district of Aachen Walheim. In 1914 the first school was built in Friesenrath, 1926 the castle Friesenrath. The Chapel of St. Bernhard was built in 1939 to plans by the Aachen architect Peter Salm and inaugurated. Together with several other municipalities, Friesenrath has been in the city of Aachen since 1 January 1972.
