= Petergensfeld =

District of Raeren, Belgium

Coordinates: 50.649°N 6.180°E

Petergensfeld is a district of the Belgian municipality of Raeren in the German-speaking community. It is located directly on the German-Belgian border and represents the western continuation of the German village Roetgen. Petergensfeld is located around 18 kilometers southeast of Aachen on the northeastern edge of the High Fens on the river Weser.In addition to the standard German taught in school and used in the community, the traditional regional "Platt" is a Ripuarian dialect.

== Location ==
Petergensfeld is a village in the municipality of Raeren, situated in the province of Liège, Wallonia, Belgium. Geographically, it lies at approximately 50.648° latitude and 6.179° longitude.

The North Sea is the nearest seacoast with a distance of around 156 km (direction NorthWest).The place is situated in the rivercatchment named Meuse. The nearest bigger lake (reservoir) is Stausee Eupen - Vesderstuwdam (1.1 km2 at a distance of 4.3 km in WestSouthWestern direction).

The most nearby international border is the German-Belgium border with a straight distance of 0.2 km in SouthEastern direction. The estimated travel distance is around 0.3 km. The nearest tripoint border within 25 km is the German Belgian Dutch tripoint with a straight distance of 16.3 km (direction NorthWest).

Elevation around place: hill: 84%, low mountains: 16%, The hills are mainly northwestern orientated.The surroundings of the place is lightly urbanised. The most common land use in the area is forest.The district is adjacent to the German village of Roetgen.

Nearest 5 places:

1 Roetgen 1.2 km East

2 Schossent 3.7 km NorthWest

3 Roetgen:Rott 4.4 km NorthNorthEast

4 Aachen:Schmithof 4.7 km North

5 Neudorf 5 km WestNorthWest

Nearest 3 capitals:

1 Luxembourg, Luxembourg 116 km South

2 Brussels, Belgium 131 km WestNorthWest

3 Amsterdam, Netherlands 212 km NorthNorthWest

== Population demographics ==
Area of Petergensfeld, Raeren, Wallonia, Belgium 0.655 km² Population 263

Male Population 129 (49.1%)

Female Population 134 (50.9%)

Population change from 1975 to 2015 +557.5%

Population change from 2000 to 2015 +33.5%

Median Age 43.4 years

Male Median Age 41.5 years

Female Median Age 45.2 years

Timezone Central European Standard Time

== Walking routes ==
The town is popular with walkers. A popular hike for those exploring the Belgium countryside is the Eschbach route which passes through Petergensfeld. This is a popular walking holiday destination and ranks as number 9 in Belgiums best hiking trails, the hike offers a walk of approximately 14 kilometres with an elevation of around 100 meters and should take approximately 3 hours to complete. The trail is home to a diverse array of flora and fauna. Walkers may see wildlife such as deer, foxes, and a variety of bird species. The forests are rich with deciduous trees, and wildflowers and other plant life that add to the trail's natural beauty. Other nearby walks around Petergensfeld includes the Osthertogenhold Loop, the Dorfrundgang Roetgen Loop and the Petergensfeld to Monschu walk.
