= Kornelimünster Abbey =

Coordinates: 50°43′43″N 6°10′41″E

- Interactive map of Kornelimünster Abbey

Monastery information
- Order: Benedictine
- Established: 814

Site
- Location: Aachen

Kornelimünster Abbey (German: Benediktinerabtei Kornelimünster), also known as Abbey of the Abbot Saint Benedict of Aniane and Pope Cornelius, is a Benedictine monastery that has been integrated since 1972. The abbey is located in Aachen (in the district of Kornelimünster/Walheim) in North Rhine-Westphalia in Germany.

== History ==
The monastery was founded in 814 on the river Inde by Benedict of Aniane, an adviser to Emperor Louis the Pious (successor to Charlemagne). The monastery was at first known as the "Monastery of the Redeemer on the Inde". In the mid-9th century, the monastery became an Imperial abbey ("Reichsunmittelbar") and received large endowments of land, as well as Biblical or Saviour's relics: a loincloth, a sudarium and two shroud-like cloths.

In 875, one of the shrouds was exchanged for a relic of the head of the martyred Pope Cornelius (died in 253), after which the abbey was known as Sancti Cornelii ad Indam, and later as Kornelimünster. (The full official title of the present monastery is the Abbey of the Abbot Saint Benedict of Aniane and Pope Cornelius).

In the 12th century, a Priest of Aachen composed the famous Tafelgüterverzeichnis, a registry of royal estates and what they owed the king's court. It is one of the earliest pieces of evidence for the extent of the German royal fisc.

Burg Reichenstein, also known as "Falkenburg", began as church property under the Imperial Abbey of Kornelimünster. It was part of the parish of Saint Clement" in Trechtingshausen. Because it was so far away, the monastery appointed knights (Vögte) as bailiffs and protectors. They had their seat at Reichenstein Castle. Over time, the bailiffs turned robber knights, getting rich off of boats traveling the River Rhine. In 1270, the monastery sold the whole parish of Saint Clement to the Cathedral Chapter at Mainz and St. Maria ad Gradus, also at Mainz.

In 1500, the Imperial abbey (Reichsabtei) of Kornelimünster became part of the Lower Rhenish–Westphalian Circle.

In 1794, Kornelimünster had been conquered by the French Republic. In 1802, the territory of Kornelimünster came under French rule, and the abbey was dissolved in the secularisation. The former abbey church of St Cornelius became the parish church, and the remaining abbey buildings became property of the Bundesland of North Rhine-Westphalia. Kornelimünster came under the Mairie system in the Kanton Burtscheid. In 1815, Kornelimünster became part of the Kingdom of Prussia and of the district (Landkreis) of Aachen. The buildings of the former Kornelimünster Imperial Abbey are now a museum of modern art.

Former territory of "Reichsabtei Kornelimünster" currently belongs to Aachen, Roetgen, Simmerath, Stolberg (Rhineland).

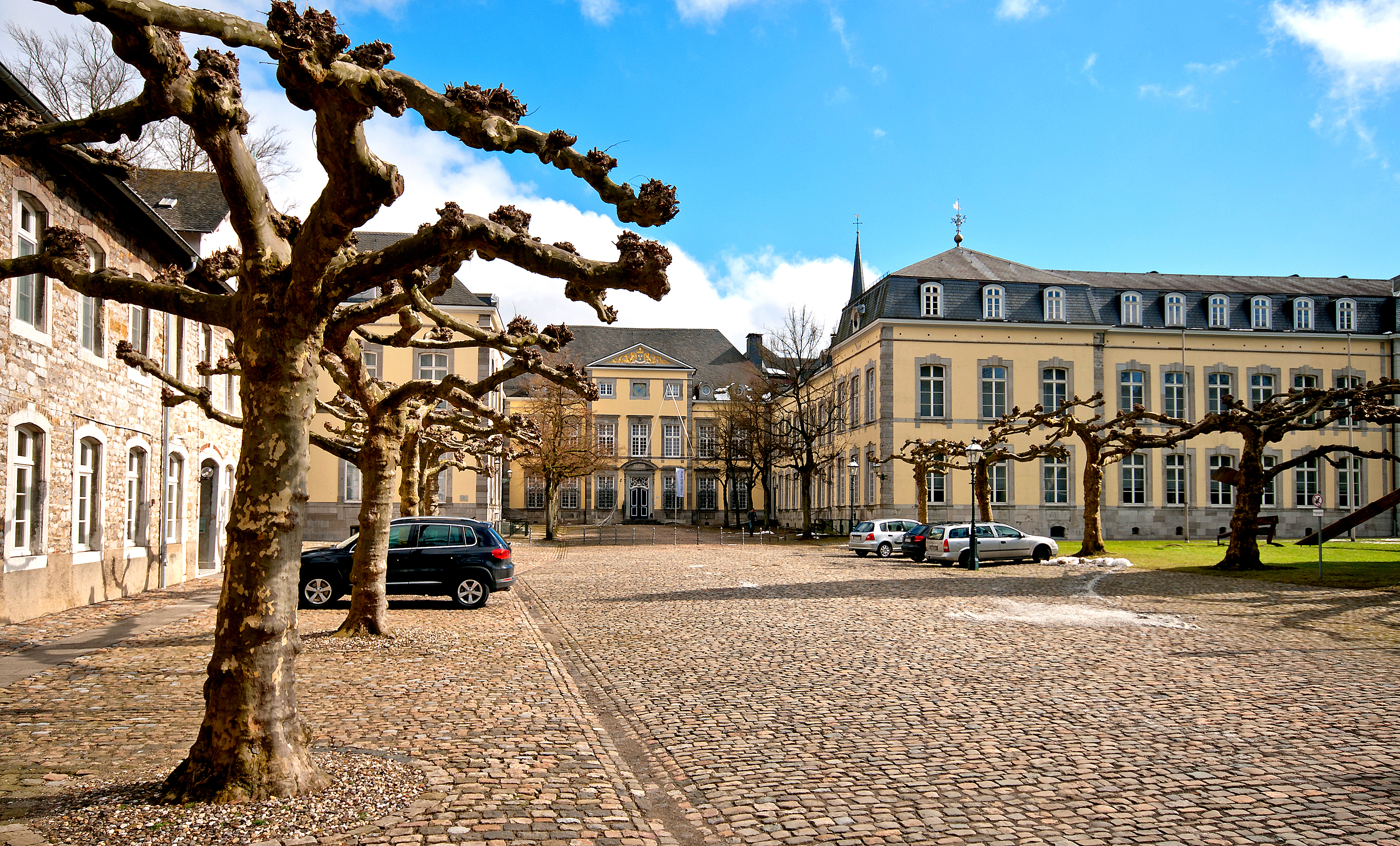
The former Reichsabtei, now a modern art museum

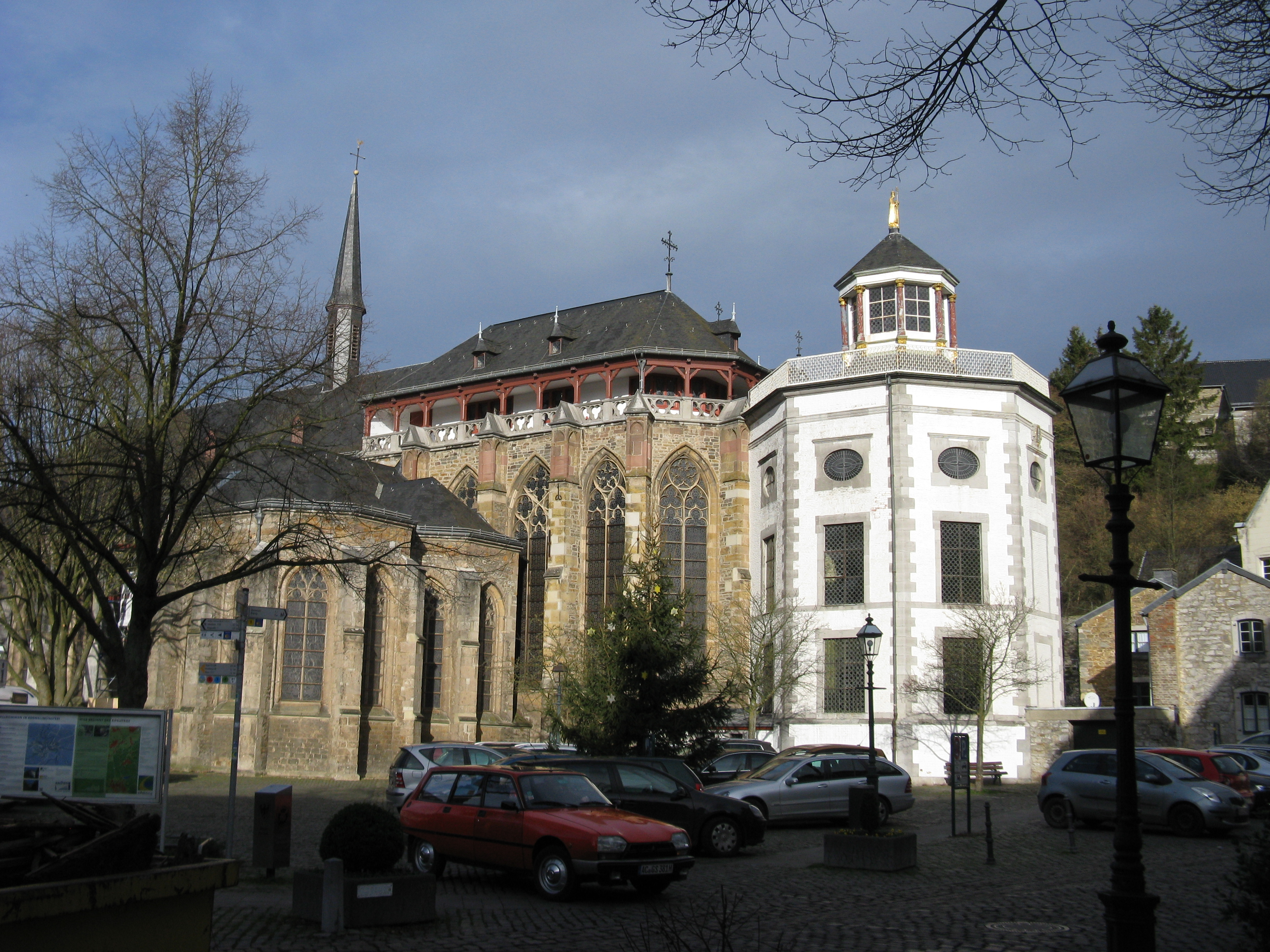
The St.Kornelius church, the former abbey church

== Second foundation ==
The monastery was re-founded by the Benedictines in 1906 about a kilometre away in the western part of Kornelimünster by monks from Merkelbeek Abbey in the Netherlands. At first the monks worked in parish ministry, before opening a boarding school in 1948. Since the school closed in 1988, they now focus on retreat tourism and hospitality. Kornelimünster is on the Way of St. James. Although not a hostel, the abbey can provide accommodations for pilgrims if booked in advance.

Kornelimünster is a member of the Subiaco Cassinese Congregation. It is an extra-provincial monastery, subject directly to the Abbot President of the Congregation. As of 2022, there were eight monks at Kornelimünster.

== See also ==
- Kornelimünster
