= Inde =

River in Belgium and Germany

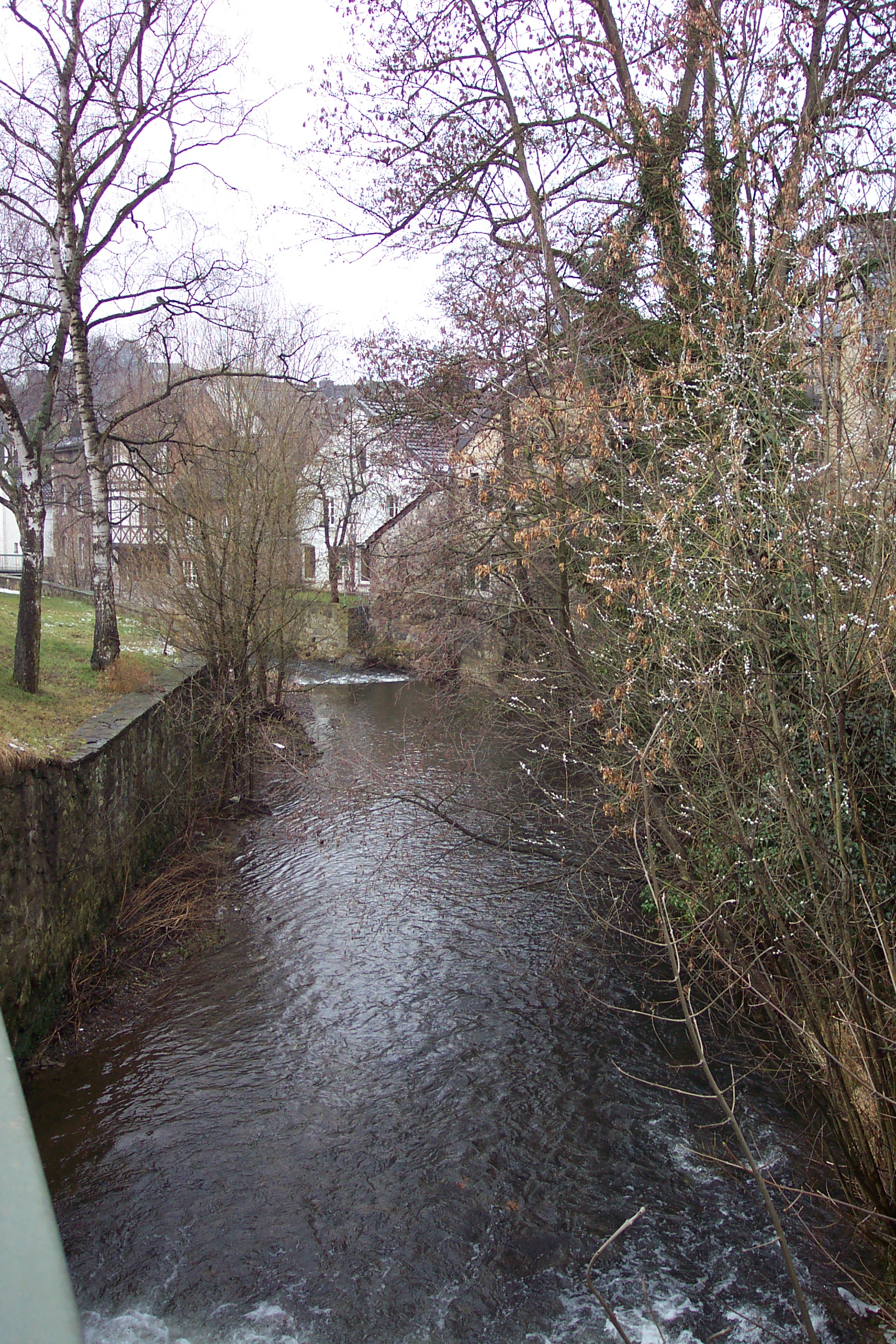
- Inde in Aachen-Kornelimünster

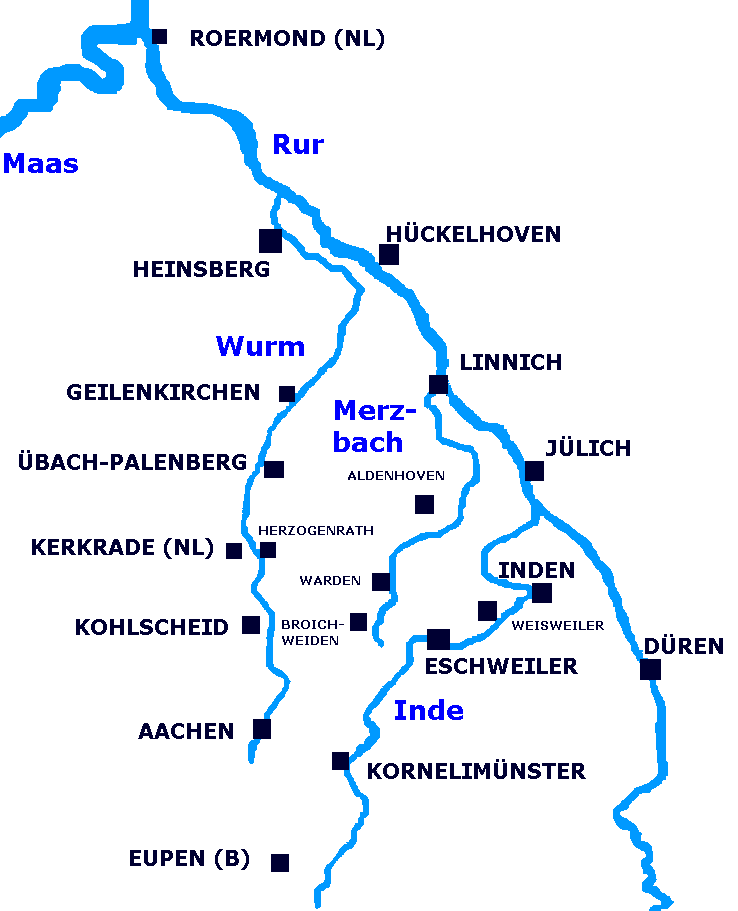
- Map of the Rur Basin, including the Inde
- Native name: L'Inde (French)

Location
- Countries: Germany and Belgium

Physical characteristics
- Source
  - location: Hautes Fagnes
  - elevation: ±400 m (1,300 ft)
- Mouth
  - location: Rur
  - coordinates: 50°53′58″N 6°21′46″E
- Length: 54.1 km (33.6 mi)
- Basin size: 374 km^{2} (144 sq mi)

Basin features
- Progression: Rur→ Meuse→ North Sea

The Inde (German pronunciation: [ˈɪndə]; French: L'Inde) is a small river in Belgium and in North Rhine-Westphalia, Germany.

== Geography ==
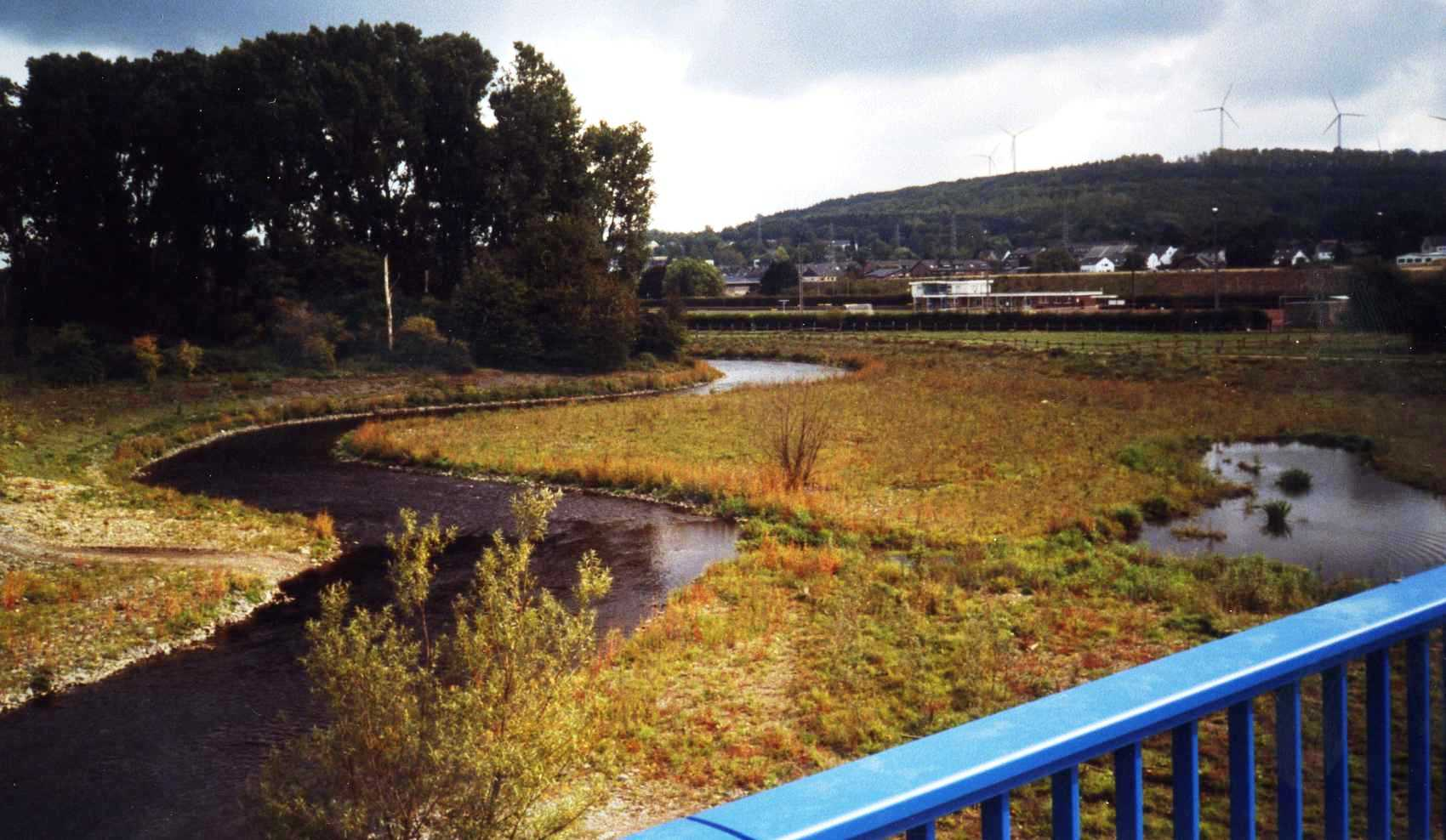
The Inde in Weisweiler

The Inde is a left (western) tributary of the Rur/Roer, in eastern Belgium and in North Rhine-Westphalia, western Germany.

Its source is near Raeren, in Eastern Belgium. The Inde runs through Aachen-Kornelimünster, Eschweiler, and Inden. Its mouth is on the Rur near Jülich. Because of lignite opencast mining, a section of the course was diverted near Inden-Lamersdorf in 2003.

Tributaries of the Inde include the streams: Omerbach, Otterbach, Saubach, Vichtbach, and Wehebach.

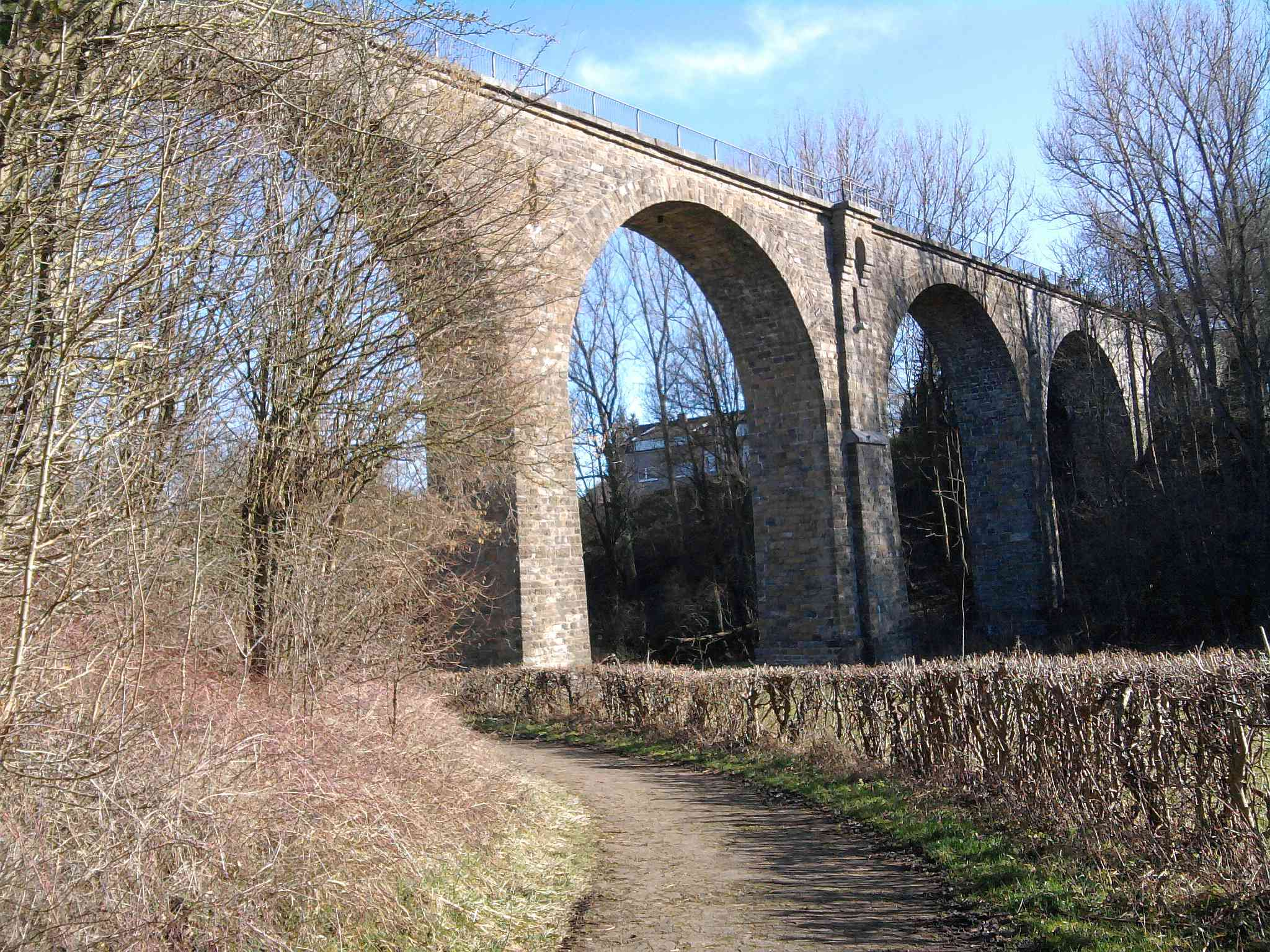
Itertalviadukt viaduct of the Vennbahn railway over the Inde

== History ==
Its name is of Celtic origin: Inda. The Inde has a counterpart, a "small Inde", in France: the Andelle, which is a 55-kilometre (34 mi) long river in the French département Seine-Maritime and whose original name was Indella.
The suffix -ella is an example for Celtic river names comparing for instance Mosella (= Moselle, i.e. "small Mosa (= Maas)"). For the name "Inde", the Indoeuropean stem *wed (= water) is supposed, like in words like Italian "onda" and French "onde" (= wave).

The Inde acquired historical importance when Emperor Louis the Pious founded the Kornelimünster Abbey monastery along one of its old courses in 815.

== See also ==
- List of rivers of North Rhine-Westphalia
