= Roetgen =

- Municipality
- Coat of arms

- Location of Roetgen within Aachen district
- Interactive map of Roetgen
- Location within Germany Location within North Rhine-Westphalia
- Coordinates: 50°39′N 6°12′E
- Country: Germany
- State: North Rhine-Westphalia
- Admin. region: Köln
- District: Aachen
- Subdivisions: 3

Government
  - Mayor (2020–25): Jorma Klauss (SPD)

Area
  - Total: 39.03 km^{2} (15.07 sq mi)
- Elevation: 386 m (1,266 ft)

Population (2025-12-31)
  - Total: 8,726
  - Density: 223.6/km^{2} (579.0/sq mi)
- Time zone: UTC+01:00 (CET)
  - Summer (DST): UTC+02:00 (CEST)
- Postal codes: 52159
- Dialling codes: 02471
- Vehicle registration: AC, MON
- Website: www.roetgen.de

Roetgen (German pronunciation: [ˈʁøːtçən]) is a municipality in the district of Aachen, in North Rhine-Westphalia, Germany.

== Geography ==
Roetgen is located approximately 16 km (10 mi) south-east of Aachen, near the border with Belgium. It is in the north of the High Fens-Eifel Nature Park on the Weser stream which rises a few kilometres to the south. Between Roetgen and Rott is the Dreilägerbach Reservoir, which is fed by the Dreilägerbach stream and the artificially Schleebachgraben and Hasselbachgraben ditches. The attached waterworks supplies large parts of Aachen and the Dutch town of Kerkrade with drinking water.

The parish of Roetgen includes the villages of Roetgen, Rott and Mulartshütte, which is the oldest part of Roetgen.

To the northwest is the borough of Aachen with its quarters of Kornelimünster and Walheim, to the northeast is the town of Stolberg with its quarters of Venwegen and Zweifall, to the southeast is the Simmerath parish of Lammersdorf. To the west, on the far side of the German-Belgian border lies the town of Eupen and the municipalities of Raeren, whose parish of Petergensfeld borders immediately on Roetgen north of Charliers Mill.

Roetgen is attractive for commuters as it is already part of the Eifel and yet is still close in proximity to Aachen.

== History ==
In World War II, Roetgen was the first German town to fall under American control. American forces arrived in the town on 12 September 1944 at 14:30 hours.

The city was the location of the court martial of US Army Private Eddie Slovik in November 1944, notable because of all US military personnel in World War II accused of desertion, Slovik was the only one sentenced to death and actually executed.

On March 13, 2019, Roetgen was hit by a low-end F3 tornado. The tornado caused moderate to severe damage to buildings and trees. Vehicles were also overturned and flipped. 5 people were injured by the tornado.

=== Division of the municipality ===
Roetgen consists of three districts:

- Roetgen
- Rott
- Mulartshütte

Mulartshütte is the oldest settlement of the three.

== Population ==
Historical population

Year	Pop.	±% p.a.
1965	4,290	—
1970	4,861	+2.53%
1975	5,347	+1.92%
1980	5,947	+2.15%
1985	6,215	+0.89%
1990	6,908	+2.14%
1995	7,443	+1.50%

Year	Pop.	±% p.a.
2000	7,906	+1.21%
2005	8,156	+0.62%
2010	8,250	+0.23%
2015	8,527	+0.66%
2020	8,650	+0.29%
2025	8,726	+0.18%

Source: Landesdatabank Nordrhein-Westfalen

== Sights ==
- St. Mary's Chapel (Marienkapelle, 1636–1660) is the surviving part of the first Roman Catholic parish church in Roetgen. It was partially demolished when the Neogothic St. Hubert's Church (1854–1856) was built. It was consecrated to Saint Hubertus of Liège, the Virgin Mary and John the Baptist.
- In Roetgen's town hall there is a sculpture of a weaver by Hermann Pier (1925–1985); outside on the forecourt is a replica. It has historical as well as artistic value, because this craft was an important part of Roetgen's economic history.
- Charliers Mill (substructure of rubble stone, 1768) is an old water mill (today a domestic residence) on the Weser stream. In the countryside behind the mill, with its pastures, rows of beech rows and ponds runs Stage 1 of the Eifelsteig hiking trail.

== Gallery ==
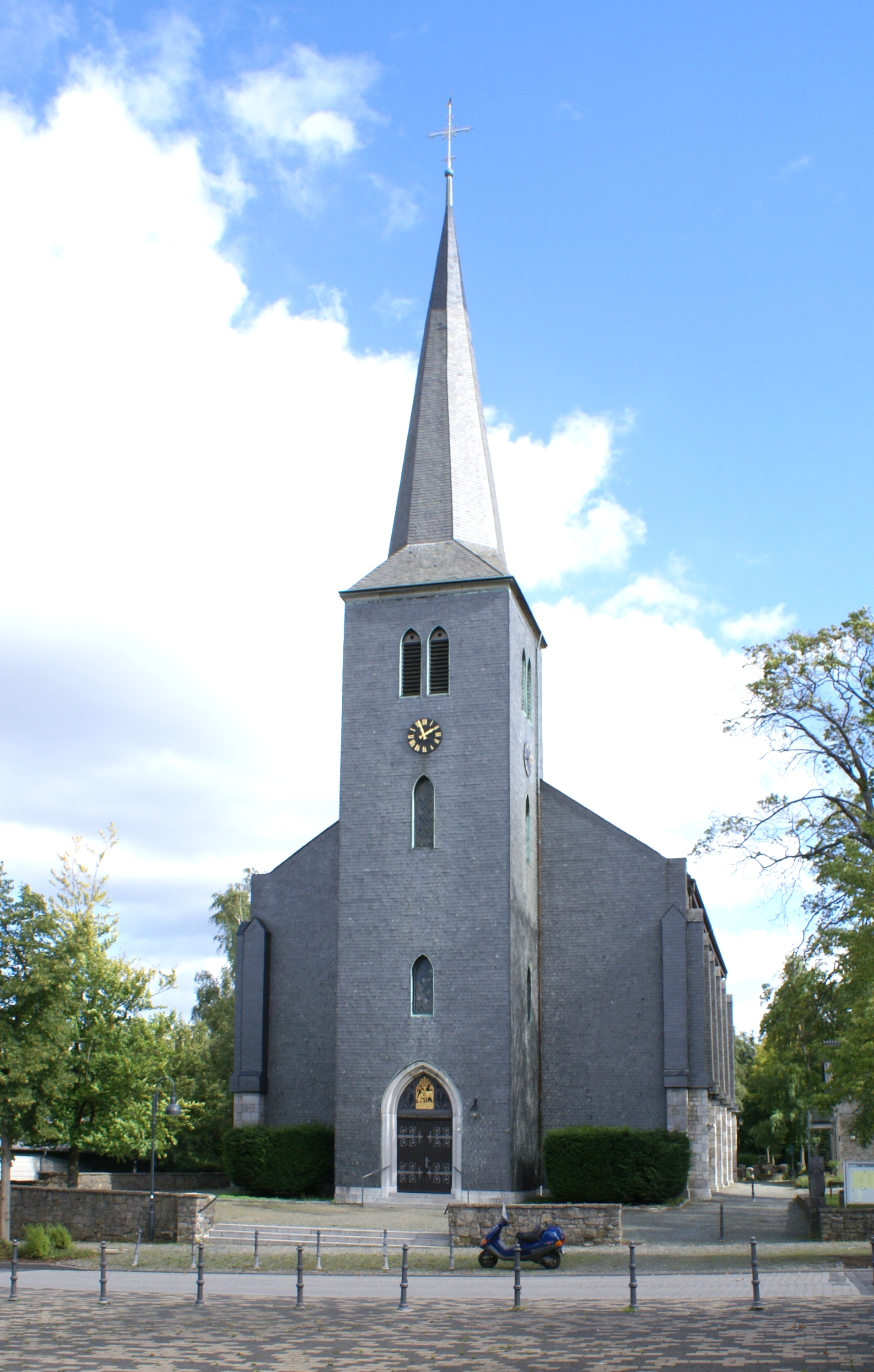
St. Hubert's Roman Catholic Church

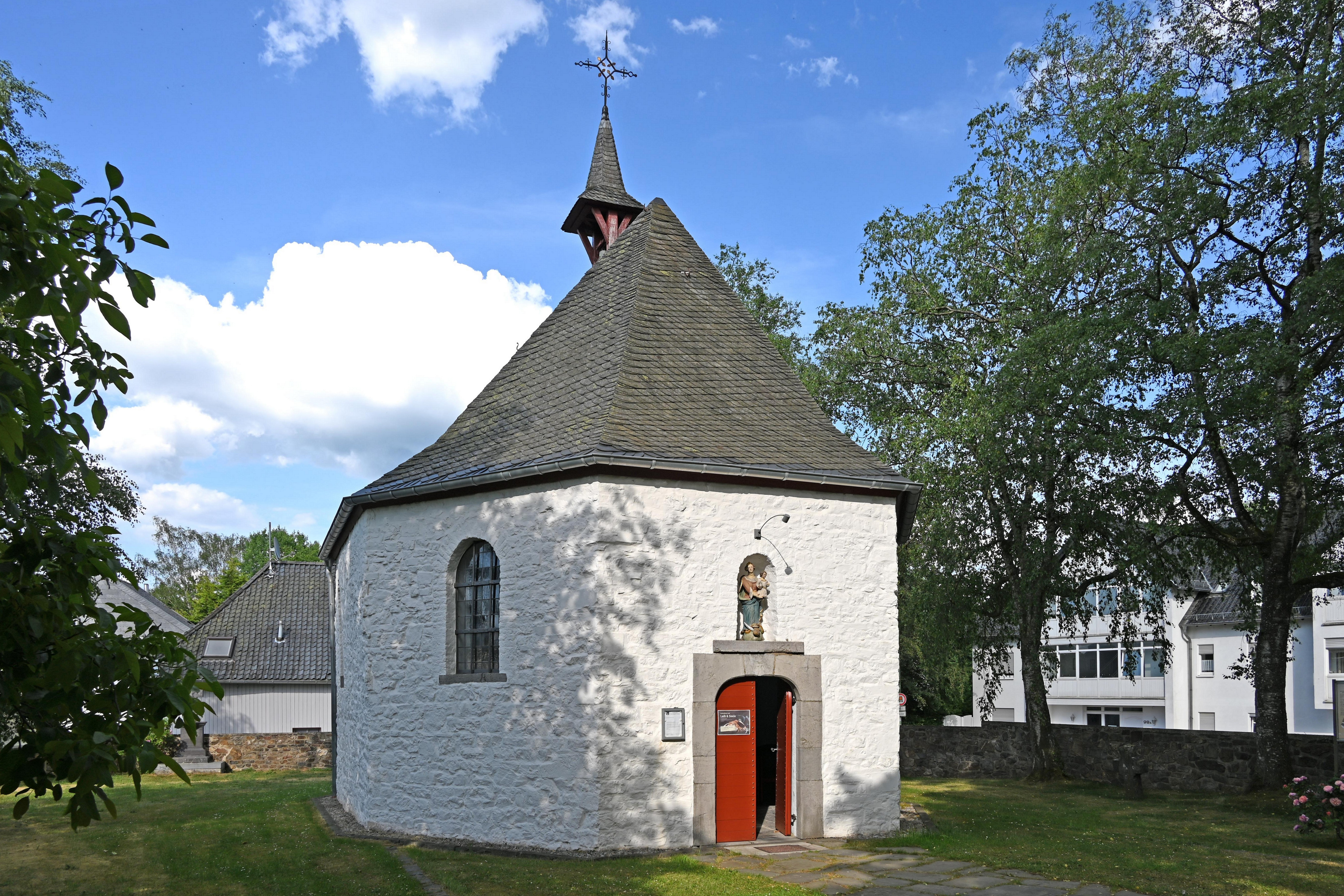
St. Mary's Chapel

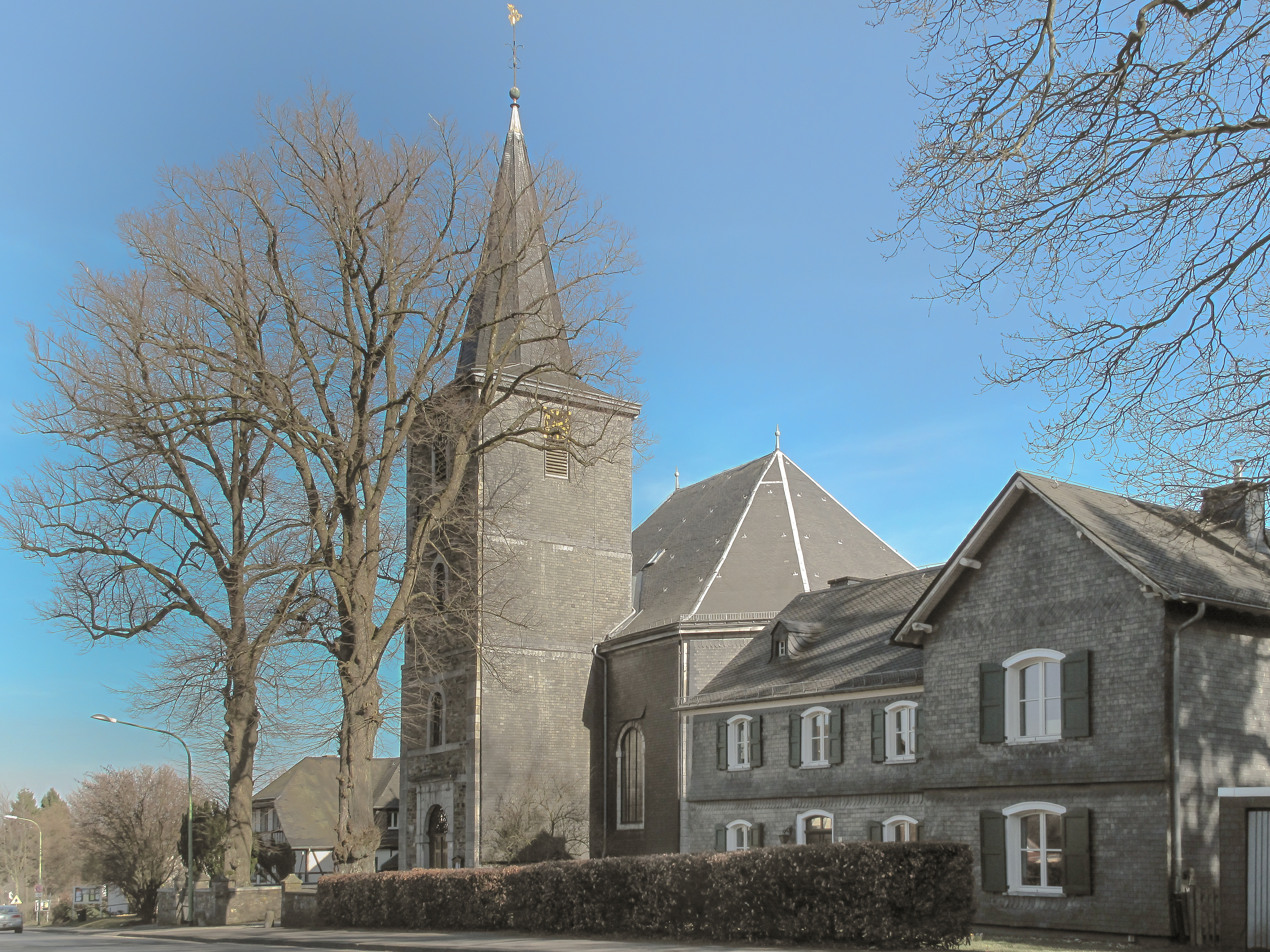
The Protestant church
