= LaFee discography =

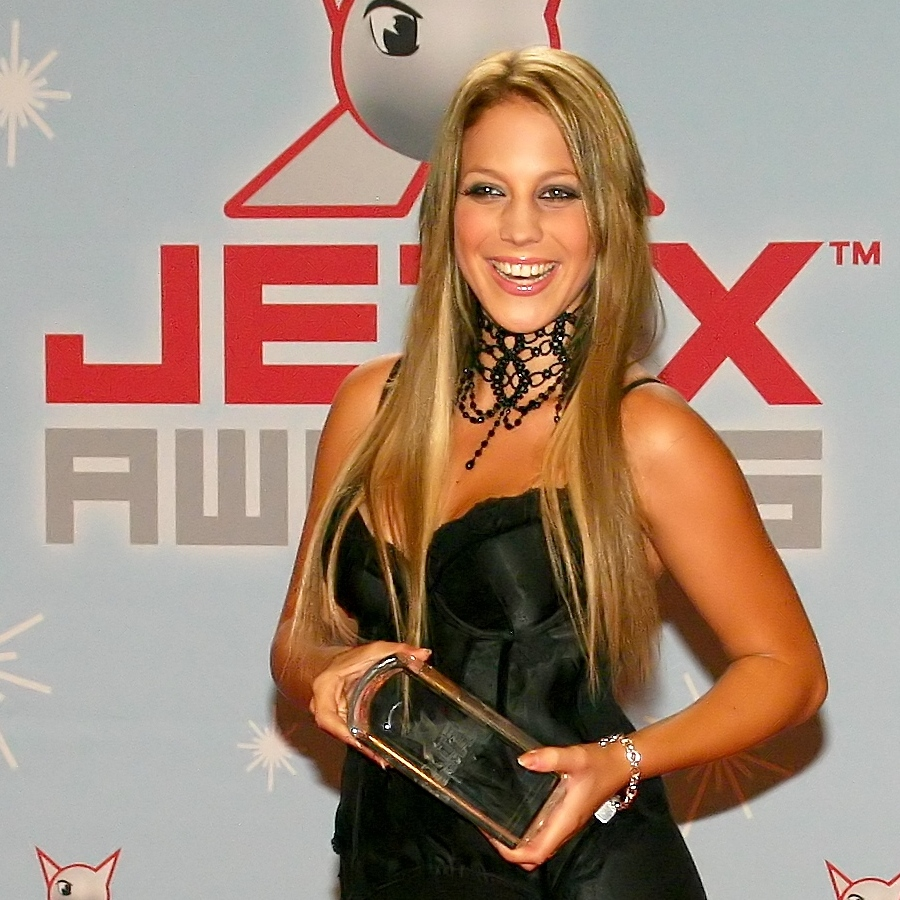
- LaFee at an award show in Berlin (2008)
- Studio albums: 6
- Compilation albums: 2
- Singles: 29
- Video albums: 3
- Music videos: 23

The discography of LaFee, a German pop rock singer, consists of six studio albums, 29 singles, one best-of album, one compilation album and three music DVDs.

== Studio albums ==
Year	Album	Chart positions				Certifications
Year	Album	GER	AUT	FRA	SWI	Certifications
2006	LaFee: Released: 22 June 2006; Label: Capitol; Formats: CD, digital download	1	1	—	19	GER: Platinum; AUT: Platinum; SWI: Gold
2007	Jetzt erst recht: Released: 6 July 2007; Label: Capitol; Formats: CD, digital download	1	1	79	14	GER: Platinum; AUT: Gold
2008	Shut Up: Released: 27 June 2008; Label: Capitol; Formats: CD, digital download	21	31	—	—	
2009	Ring frei: Released: 2 January 2009; Label: Capitol; Formats: CD, digital download	6	5	185	21	AUT: Gold
2011	Frei: Released: 19 August 2011; Label: Capitol; Formats: CD, digital download	14	21	—	34	
2021	Zurück in die Zukunft: Released: 20 August 2021; Label: Telamo; Formats: CD, digital download, streaming	7	14	—	54	
2025	Schatten & Licht: Released: 24 October 2025; Label: Lucky Bob; Formats: CD, vinyl, digital download, streaming	8	62	—	—	
"—" denotes a title that did not chart or was not released in that territory.

== Compilation albums ==
Year	Album
2009	Best Of: Released: 27 November 2009; Label: Capitol; Formats: CD, digital download
2011	Classic Albums – LaFee/Jetzt erst recht: Released: 23 May 2011; Label: Capitol (Universal Music); Formats: CD, digital download

== Singles ==
Year	Song	Chart peak positions			Album	
Year	Song	GER	AUT	SWI	Album	
2006	"Virus"	14	14	70	LaFee	
2006	"Prinzesschen"	11	10	25	LaFee	
2006	"Was ist das"	17	25	59	LaFee	
2006	"Mitternacht"	23	23	—	LaFee	
2007	"Heul doch"	3	6	25	Jetzt erst recht	
2007	"Beweg dein Arsch"	22	35	87	Jetzt erst recht	
2007	"Wer bin ich"	25	41	—	Jetzt erst recht	
2008	"Shut Up"	—	—	—	Shut Up	
2008	"Ring frei"	22	31	—	Ring frei	
2009	"Scheiss Liebe"	44	63	—	Ring frei	
2009	"Der Regen fällt" (2009)	94	—	—	Best Of	
2011	"Ich bin"	80	53	—	Frei	
2011	"Leben wir jetzt"	-	—	—	Frei	
2012	"Zeig dich!"	—	—	—	Hanni & Nanni OST	
2012	"Flip Flop (Can't help myself)" as Tina LaFee vs. Johnny Kelvin	—	—	—	Non-album single	
2015	"Was bleibt"	75	—	—	Non-album singles	
2015	"Die ganze Welt"	—	—	—	Non-album singles	
2015	"Hysteria"	—	—	—	Non-album singles	
2015	"So gut!"	—	—	—	Non-album singles	
2015	"Dein Geschenk"	—	—	—	Non-album singles	
2016	"Ich gehör nur mir!"	—	—	—	Non-album singles	
2016	"Schwarze Tränen"	—	—	—	Non-album singles	
2017	"Kämpferherz"	—	—	—	Non-album singles	
2018	"Kartenhaus"	—	—	—	Non-album single	
2020	"Hand in Hand"Original : beFour	—	—	—	Goldene Weihnachtshits	
2021	"(Ich bin ein) Material Girl" Original:Madonna – Material Girl	—	—	—	Zurück in die Zukunft	
2021	"Halt mich fest" Original: a-ha – Take On Me	—	—	—	Zurück in die Zukunft	
2021	"Heul doch (80s Version)"	—	—	—	Zurück in die Vergangenheit (Fanbox-Edition Bonus-CD)	
2021	"Rock Me Amadeus" featuring Falco	—	—	—	Zurück in die Zukunft	"—" denotes a title that did not chart or was not released in that territory.

== Music videos ==
Year	Title	Director
2006	"Virus"	Bastien Francois
2006	"Prinzesschen"	Bastien Francois
2006	"Was ist das?"	Bastien Francois
2006	"Mitternacht"	Bastien Francois
2007	"Heul doch"	Bastien Francois
2007	"Beweg dein Arsch"	Bastien Francois
2007	"Wer bin ich?"	Bastien Francois
2008	"Shut Up"	Bastien Francois
2008	"Ring frei"	Bastien Francois
2009	"Scheiss Liebe"	
2009	"Der Regen fällt" (2009)	
2011	"For Once and for All"	
2011	"Ich bin"	Daniel Lwowski
2011	"Leben wir jetzt"	Sandra Marschner
2012	"Hard to Know"	Andreas Z Simon
2012	"Zeig dich!"	
2014	"Kinder dieser Welt"	WeltChristian Hattesen, Norleon Graff
2018	"Kartenhaus"	Sandeep Mehta
2020	"Hand in Hand"	
2021	"(Ich bin ein) Material Girl"	Adam Aboou
2021	"Halt mich fest"	Jordan Production
2021	"Halt mich fest" (Acoustic Version)	Jordan Production
2021	"Rock Me Amadeus"	Jordan Production

== Video albums ==
Year	Album details	Chart peak positions		Certifications
Year	Album details	GER	AUT	Certifications
2006	Secret Live: Released: 24 November 2006; Label: Capitol; Format: DVD	—	4	GER: Gold
2007	Erst recht mit VIVA: Released: 28 September 2007; Label: Capitol; Format: DVD	6	4	
2007	Wer bin ich / Ein ungeschminktes Märchen: Released: 9 November 2007; Label: Capitol; Format: DVD	—	—	
"—" denotes a title that did not chart or was not released in that territory.
