= Best Of (LaFee album) =

Greatest hits album by LaFee
- Released: 27 November 2009
- Recorded: 2004–2009
- Genre: Alternative rock
- Label: EMI, Capitol
- Producer: Bob Arnz

LaFee chronology
Ring frei (2008)	Best Of (2009)	Frei (2011)

Alternative covers
- Die Nacht edition

Singles from Best Of – LaFee
- 1. "Der Regen fällt" Released: 13 November 2009

Best Of is the first greatest hits compilation by German pop rock singer LaFee, released on 27 November 2009 by Capitol Records and EMI. It was released in two different editions, "Die Tag Edition" ("Day Edition") and "Die Nacht Edition" ("Night Edition"). "Die Tag Edition" features one CD of all singles as well some album tracks and B-sides. "Die Nacht Edition" has a second CD which features most of the remaining B-sides as well some more album tracks taken from both her English and German albums.

A new version of "Der Regen fällt", which originally featured on her second German album Jetzt erst recht, was released as the compilation's lead single.

== Track listing ==
All songs written by Bob Arnz, Gerd Zimmermann and LaFee.

=== Die Tag edition ===
1. "Virus" (Radio version) – 3:46
2. "Scheiss Liebe" – 3:43
3. "Was ist das" (Radio version) – 3:22
4. "Prinzesschen" (Radio version) – 3:37
5. "Mitternacht" (Album version) – 4:46
6. "Heul doch" (Single version) – 3:36
7. "Wer bin ich" (Single version) – 4:17
8. "Ring frei" (Single version) – 3:31
9. "Der Regen fällt" (2009) – 3:36
10. "Wo bist du (Mama)" – 4:41
11. "Normalerweise" – 3:54
12. "Du liebst mich nicht" – 4:41
13. "Beweg dein Arsch" – 2:41
14. "Sterben für dich" – 2:58

=== Die Nacht edition ===
CD1

1. "Virus" (Radio version) – 3:46
2. "Scheiss Liebe" – 3:43
3. "Was ist das" (Radio version) – 3:22
4. "Prinzesschen" (Radio version) – 3:37
5. "Mitternacht" (Album version) – 4:46
6. "Heul doch" (Single version) – 3:36
7. "Wer bin ich" (Single version) – 4:17
8. "Ring frei" (Single version) – 3:31
9. "Der Regen fällt" (2009) – 3:36
10. "Wo bist du (Mama)" – 4:41
11. "Normalerweise" – 3:54
12. "Du liebst mich nicht" – 4:41
13. "Beweg dein Arsch" – 2:41
14. "Sterben für dich" (Piano version) – 3:01

CD2

1. "Es tut weh" – 4:02
2. "Weg von dir" (Orchesterversion) – 3:53
3. "Krank" – 2:10
4. "Alles ist neu" – 3:47
5. "Mitternacht" (Live @ Echo) – 3:48
6. "Shut Up" – 4:04
7. "Beweg dein Arsch" (Club mix) – 2:49
8. "Für dich" (Live) – 3:48
9. "Prinzesschen" (Live version) – 4:25
10. "Lass mich frei" (Piano version) – 2:54
11. "Scabies" – 3:57
12. "Wer bin ich" (Klassikversion) – 4:28
13. "Warum" – 3:35
14. "Danke" – 4:22
