= Ring frei =

Ring frei may refer to:

- Ring frei (album), a 2009 album by LaFee
- "Ring frei" (song), a 2008 song by LaFee
