= Hartmut Ritzerfeld =

German painter (1950–2024)

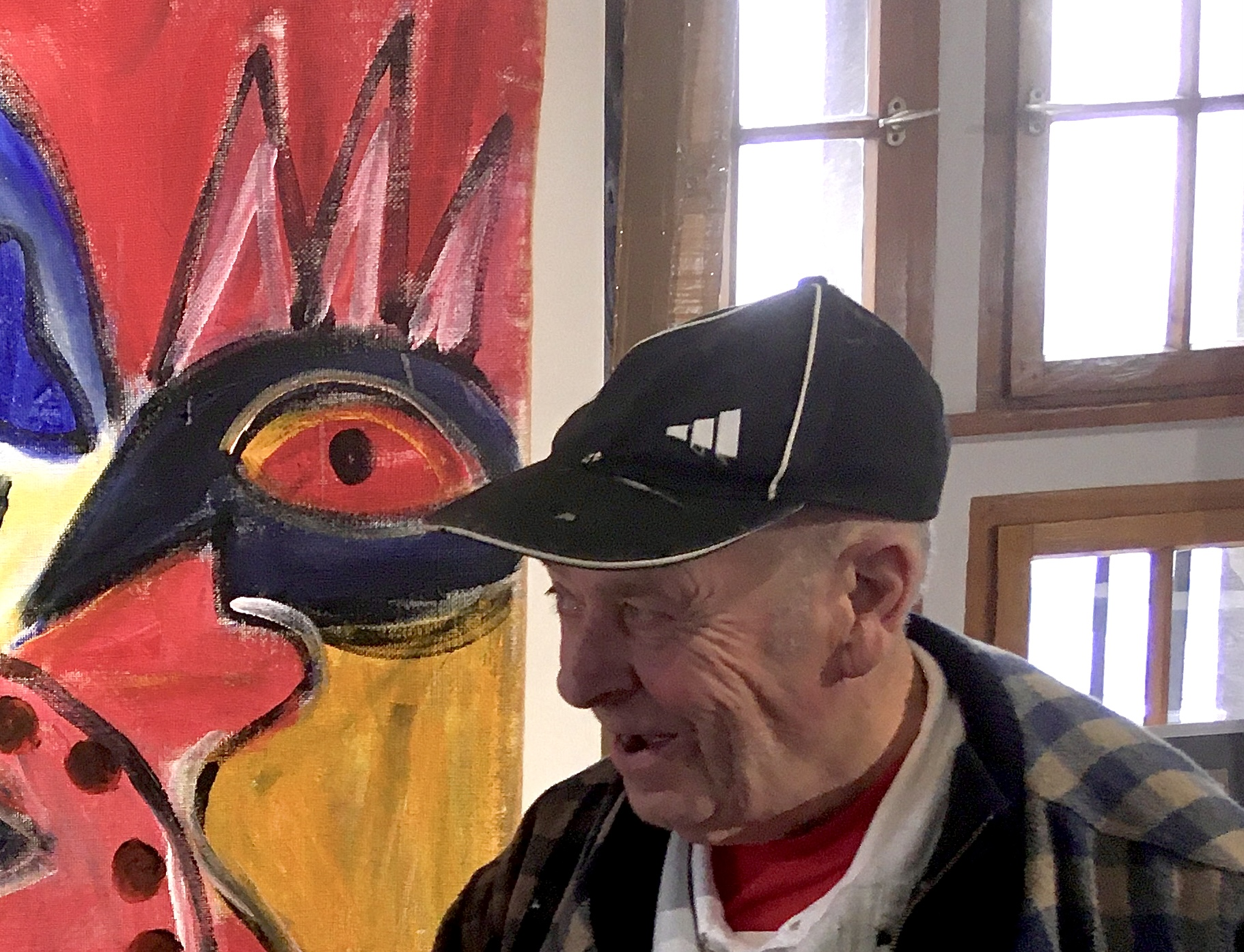
- Born: 7 October 1950; Büsbach
- Died: 1 January 2024 (aged 73); Büsbach
- Education: Kunstakademie Düsseldorf
- Occupation: Painter

Hartmut "Hacky" Ritzerfeld (7 October 1950 – 1 January 2024) was a German painter of neo-expressive figurative images.

== Life ==
Born in Büsbach, Ritzerfeld initially trained as a window dresser from 1965 to 1968 before studying at the Kunstakademie Düsseldorf from 1969 to 1976 with Joseph Beuys (painting, object and performance art) and Karl Kneidl (stage design). In 1975 he became a master student of Joseph Beuys. This was followed by a study visit to Zurich. He then lived briefly in Aachen before moving back to his parents' house in Stolberg.

Ritzerfeld made his first 'artistic attempts' in the style of the Vienna School of fantastic realism in 1968; The model was the Viennese painter Ernst Fuchs. Shortly afterwards he turned to expressionism; with some of his favourite subjects being portraits, landscapes, and interiors. As a 20-year-old he was able to see Beuys on television; an initial spark that prompted Ritzerfeld to become interested in his works. In the very first year of his “Beuys period” he turned around to the classical style of the Düsseldorf School of painting, with Andreas Achenbach being particularly influential. Through the metaphysical painting of Carlo Carrà and the naive peasant painting of Mirko Virius, he finally arrived at painting with an organic purpose. He increasingly favoured architectural painting: “I painted what was going on in a city around me and tried to make this visible through abstract forms.” Thereafter he found his own “grammar”, which is more precise in its image structure than that of the Neue Wilde.

From 1994, Ritzerfeld had a shared studio with his fellow artist Angelika Kühnen, first in Breinig, then in the Suermondt-Ludwig-Museum and since 2012 in Stolberg-Büsbach (European Art Court). Ritzerfeld's work is represented in numerous collections and museums including in the Suermondt-Ludwig Museum in Aachen, which, among other things, received the collection of Peter Lacroix with numerous pictures by Ritzerfeld as a donation in 2006.

Ritzerfeld, along with Win Braun as well as Emil Sorge and Franz-Bernd Becker, was one of the founders of the Eifelmaler group.

== Death ==
Ritzerfeld was hit by a car in Büsbach in early December 2023. In the traffic accident he suffered a laceration to his head, a traumatic brain injury, and a fractured pelvis. He died from his injuries on 1 January 2024, in Stolberg Bethlehem Hospital. He was 73.

== Exhibitions ==
Works by Hartmut Ritzerfeld have been shown in numerous exhibitions, especially in Germany:

- 1976 Galerie Arno Kohnen, Düsseldorf
- 1986–1989 Leopold-Hoesch-Museum, Düren, Katalog
- 1986–1989 Neue Galerie, Sammlung Ludwig, Aachen
- 1988 Suermondt-Ludwig-Museum, Aachen
- 1988 Kunstmuseum Bonn
- 1988 Städtisches Museum Ulm
- 1988 Landesmuseum für Kunst- und Kulturgeschichte, Oldenburg
- 1988 Neue Galerie, Sammlung Murken, Meerbusch
- 1989 Museum Wiesbaden
- 1989–1998 Städtische Galerie Regensburg
- 1995–2000 Kunst und Breinig, Solberg
- 1993 Leopold-Hoesch-Museum, Düren
- 1997–1998 Ludwig Forum für internationale Kunst, Aachen
- 1998 Haubrichforum, Köln
- 1998 Kunsthalle Barmen
- 1998 Von der Heydt-Museum, Wuppertal
- 1998 Kunstmuseum Thun, Schweiz
- 1998 Städtische Galerie Albstadt
- 1999 Landgericht Aachen
- 1999 Städtische Galerie Aschaffenburg
- 1999 Städtische Galerie Delmenhorst, Haus Coburg
- 2000 Schloss Babenhausen, Hessischer Kulturverein
- 2000–2001 Städtisches Museum Leverkusen, Schloss Morsbroich
- 2001 Museum Zitadelle, Jülich
- 2002 Dorotheum-Palais, Wien, Österreich
- 2004 Museum Zinkhütter Hof, Stolberg
- 2004 Museumsinsel Lüttenheid, Klaus Groth Museum, Heide
- 2007 La otra Galerià, Port d’Andratx, Mallorca, Spanien
- 2007 Associacio Cultural, "Sa Taronja“, Port d’Andratx, Mallorca, Spanien
- 2008 Galerie Sommer, Graz, Österreich
- 2008 Galerie S, Aachen
- 2008 Planet Vivid Gallery, Frankfurt a. M.
- 2009 PostForum, Düren
- 2020 Burg Stolberg, Stolberg
