= Shut Up (LaFee album) =

Studio album by LaFee
- Released: 27 June 2008
- Recorded: 2008
- Genre: Alternative rock; goth-pop
- Label: EMI
- Producer: Bob Arnz

LaFee chronology
Jetzt erst recht (2007)	Shut Up (2008)	Ring frei (2008)

Singles from LaFee
- 1. "Shut Up" Released: 23 May 2008

Shut Up is the third studio album recorded by German singer LaFee, released on 27 June 2008. The music video for the first single, "Shut Up", premiered on 30 May on The Dome. Shut Up is LaFee's first English album and contains English-language versions of songs from her first two studio albums, LaFee and Jetzt erst recht.

It was released officially in Japan on 28 January 2009 and features the same cover artwork used on the first single, "Shut Up", instead of the artwork from the album's original release.

== Track listing ==
1. "Midnight Strikes" (EN version of "Mitternacht") – 4:46
2. "Shut Up" (EN version of "Heul doch") – 4:04
3. "Now's the Time" (EN version of "Jetzt erst recht") – 4:07
4. "On the First Night" (EN version of "Das erste Mal") – 3:20
5. "Come On" (EN version of "Beweg dein Arsch") – 2:41
6. "Set Me Free" (EN version of "Lass mich frei") – 3:29
7. "Tell Me Why" (EN version of "Wer bin ich")- 4:28
8. "Little Princess" (EN version of "Prinzesschen") – 4:21
9. "Scabies" (EN version of "Virus") – 3:57
10. "What's Wrong with Me" (EN version of "Was ist das") – 4:00
11. "Lonely Tears" (EN version of "Der Regen fällt") – 4:29
12. "Hot" (EN version of "Heiß") – 3:24

== Charts ==
Chart (2006)	Peak position
Austrian Albums Chart	31
German Albums Chart	21
