= Ich bin =

Single by LaFee

from the album Frei
- Released: 10 June 2011
- Recorded: 2011
- Genre: Pop
- Length: 2:57
- Label: EMI
- Songwriter(s): Peter Hoffmann, David Bonk, Timo Sonnenschein, Jennifer Kästel

LaFee singles chronology
"Der Regen fällt" (2009)	"Ich bin" (2011)	"Leben wir jetzt" (2011)

"Ich bin" ("I Am") is a song recorded by German singer LaFee. It was released as the lead single of her fifth studio album, Frei, on 10 June 2011. The song was used as the opening theme of the German scripted reality series Family Stories.

== Background ==
LaFee first performed the song on 4 June 2011 at the German show The Dome, which was her first live performance since 2009.

== Track listing ==
- German CD single
1. "Ich bin" – 2:57
2. "Unschuldig" – 3:02
- Promotional single
1. "Ich bin" – 2:57
- Digital download
1. "Ich bin" – 2:57
2. "Unschuldig" – 3:02

== Charts ==
Chart (2011)	Peak position
Austria (Ö3 Austria Top 40)	53
Germany (GfK)	80

== Release history ==
Region	Date	Format
Germany	29 May 2011	Digital download
Germany	10 June 2011	CD single
