= Leben wir jetzt =

Single by LaFee

from the album Frei
- Released: 11 November 2011
- Recorded: 2011
- Genre: Pop
- Length: 3:15
- Label: EMI
- Songwriter(s): LaFee, Timo Sonnenschein and Jennifer Kästel

LaFee singles chronology
"Ich bin" (2011)	"Leben wir jetzt" (2011)	"Zeig Dich!" (2012)

"Leben wir jetzt" (English: Now We Live) is a song recorded by German singer LaFee. The song was released as the second single of her fifth studio album Frei on 11 November 2011.

== Production ==
The producer of "Leben wir jetzt" is David Bonk with the help of Peter Hoffmann. The songwriters are LaFee, Timo Sonnenschein and Jennifer Kästel.

== Music video and chart history ==
"Leben wir jetzt" is the thirteenth song of LaFee's made into a music video. It did not successfully make the charts. In the music video LaFee is playing a role as a mother with her young children along with singing and dancing.

== Track listing ==
- German CD single
1. "Leben wir jetzt" – 3:15
2. "Ich bin (Acoustic Version)" – 3:04

== Release history ==
Region	Date	Format
Germany; Austria; Switzerland	November 11, 2011	CD single
