= Flachsbach =

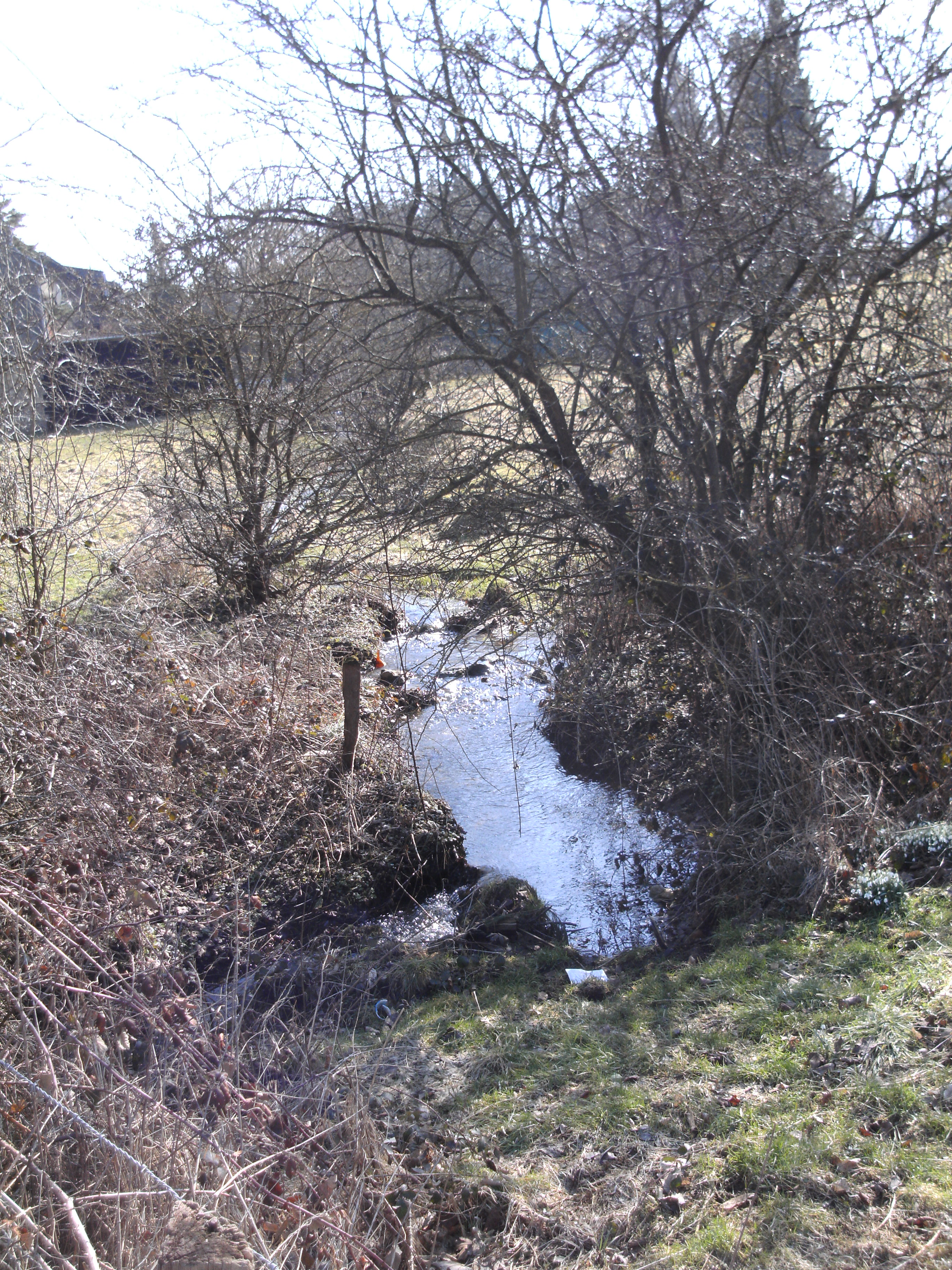
- Flachsbach near Büsbach

Location
- Country: Germany
- State: North Rhine-Westphalia

Physical characteristics
- Source
  - location: Büsbach – Breinig
  - elevation: 229 metres (751 ft)
- Mouth
  - location: Inde
  - coordinates: 50.7537°N 6.1993°E
- Length: 1.9 km (1.2 mi)

Basin features
- Progression: Inde→ Rur→ Meuse→ North Sea

Flachsbach is a rivulet in the German village of Büsbach. It is a right tributary to the river Inde.

The Flachsbach flowing through the south of Büsbach has its source in the pasture between the villages Büsbach and Breinig. Pottery findings dated 900 AD proved that there had been in a settlement in the surroundings of the rivulet. It finally led to the development of Büsbach.

Rivulet of flax, the translation of the German name Flachsbach can be explained by the handling of flax in the past utilising the rivulets hydropower.
