= Büsbach =

- Village of Stolberg
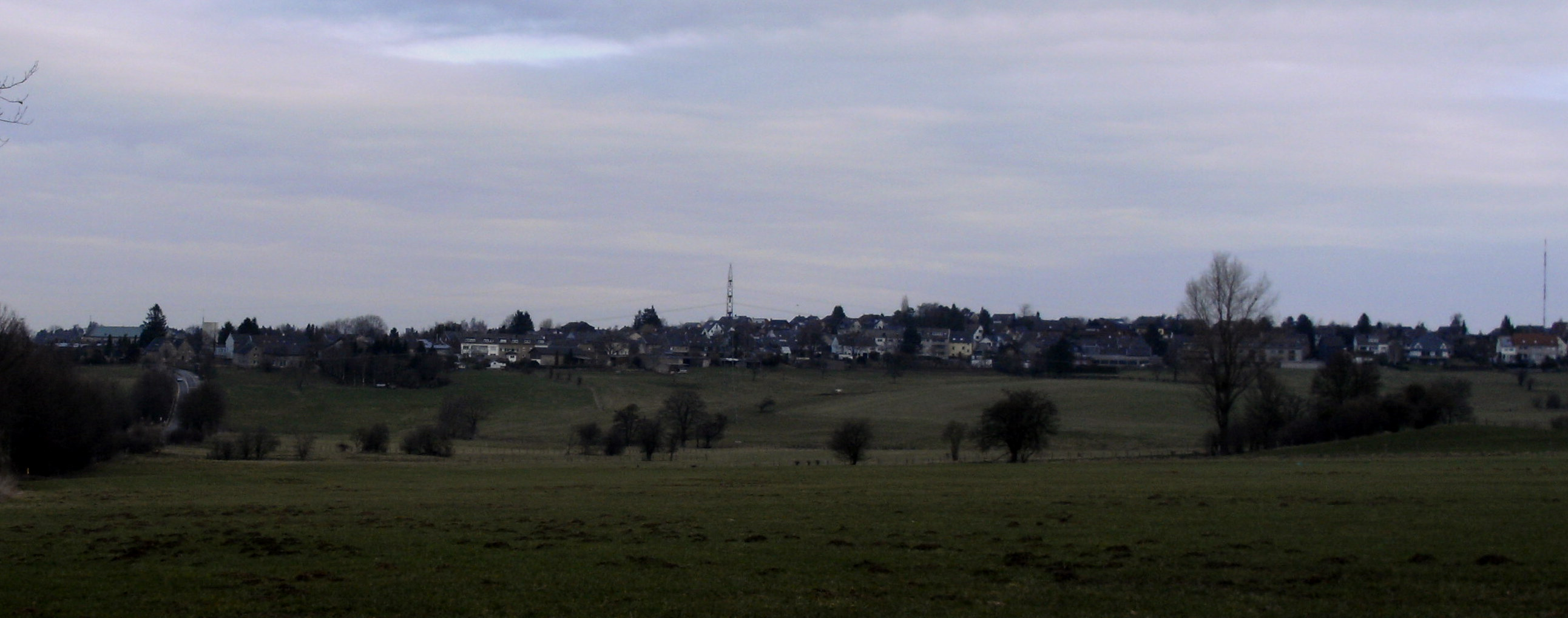
- Interactive map of Büsbach
- Location within Germany Location within North Rhine-Westphalia
- Coordinates: 50°45′N 6°13′E
- Country: Germany
- State: North Rhine-Westphalia
- Admin. region: Köln
- District: Aachen
- Town: Stolberg

Population (2017)
  - Total: 7,077
- Time zone: UTC+01:00 (CET)
  - Summer (DST): UTC+02:00 (CEST)
- Postal codes: 52223
- Dialling codes: 02402
- Vehicle registration: AC
- Website: www.buesbach.de

Büsbach is the largest of 17 districts and villages belonging to the German town of Stolberg (Rhineland).

== Geography ==
Büsbach, located on a knoll of limestone, is surrounded by several villages. In the north Münsterbusch is directly neighboured to Büsbach while Breinig and Dorff in southern direction are separated by pasture. Stolbergs district Oberstolberg as well as its industrial estate with companies like Prym or Chemie Grünenthal can be found in the east.

In the southeast of Büsbach the natural reserves Bärenstein and Brockenberg, former mining areas, offer biotopes for rare flowers, insects and amphibians while the natural reserve Tatternsteine mit Talaue is famous for its geology.

== History ==
Early traces of human activity were discovered in the southeast of Büsbach where implements dated approximately 10.000 B.C. (Mesolithic) had been excavated. Artifacts found by historians in the west of Büsbach could be dated between 5000 and 1900 B.C.

The Ancient Romans, supported by a small Roman road connecting Kornelimünster and Jülich, started mining in the southeast of Büsbach as traces of settlements from the first to third century proved.

Pottery dated 900 AD had been found near the Flachsbach, a small rivulet flowing through the south of the village. It verified human activity in this area.

Between 1794 and 1815 Büsbach belonged to the town of Eschweiler. In 1816 it became part of the Prussian empire and was governed by the city of Aachen. The situation changed again in 1913 when parts of Büsbach (Schneidmühle and Jordansberg) had been administered by the mayor of Stolberg.

Since 1935 Büsbach is a district of Stolberg.

== Main sights ==
The church of Büsbach, St. Hubertus, is a well-known landmark. Built in 1894 it was called the dome of the Eifel due to its characteristic church spire. After the spire became dilapidated it had to be demolished.

The old administration building which had also been used as a school building was built at the end of the 19th century. It is located at the marketplace and used as a community building.

The memorial Bareschesser reminds the inhabitants of Büsbach of an event leading to the nickname Bareschesser for the people living in this village.

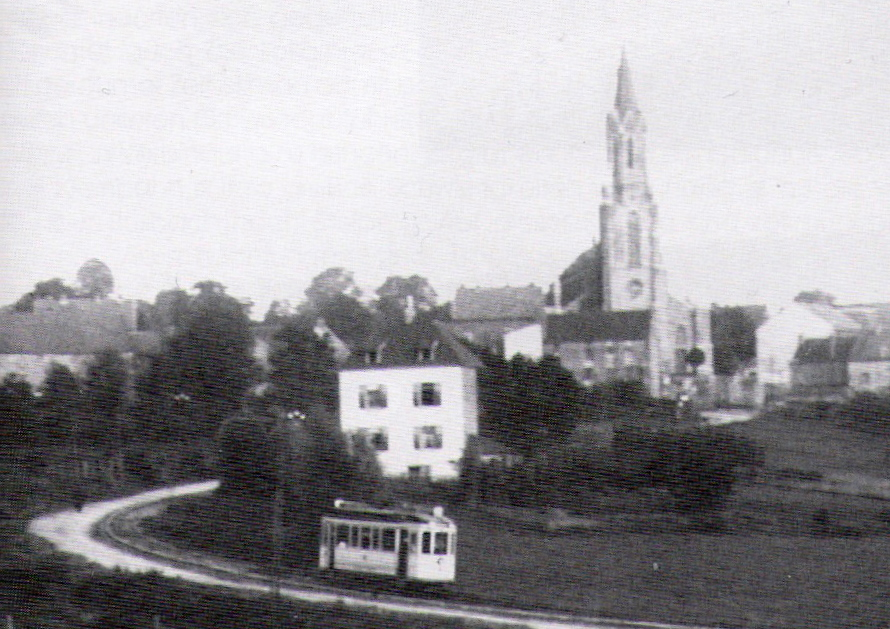
St. Hubertus in 1903

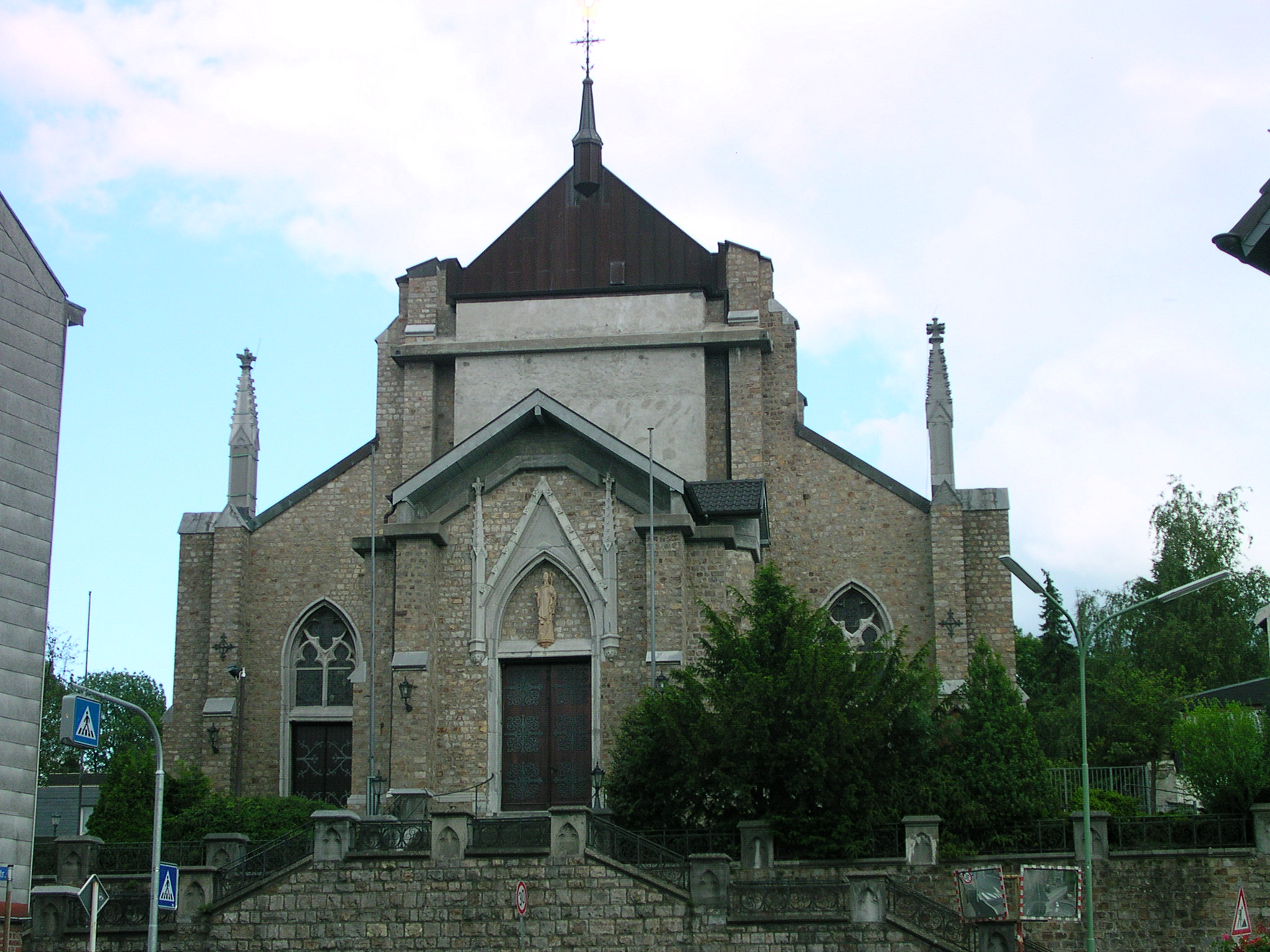
St. Hubertus in 2006

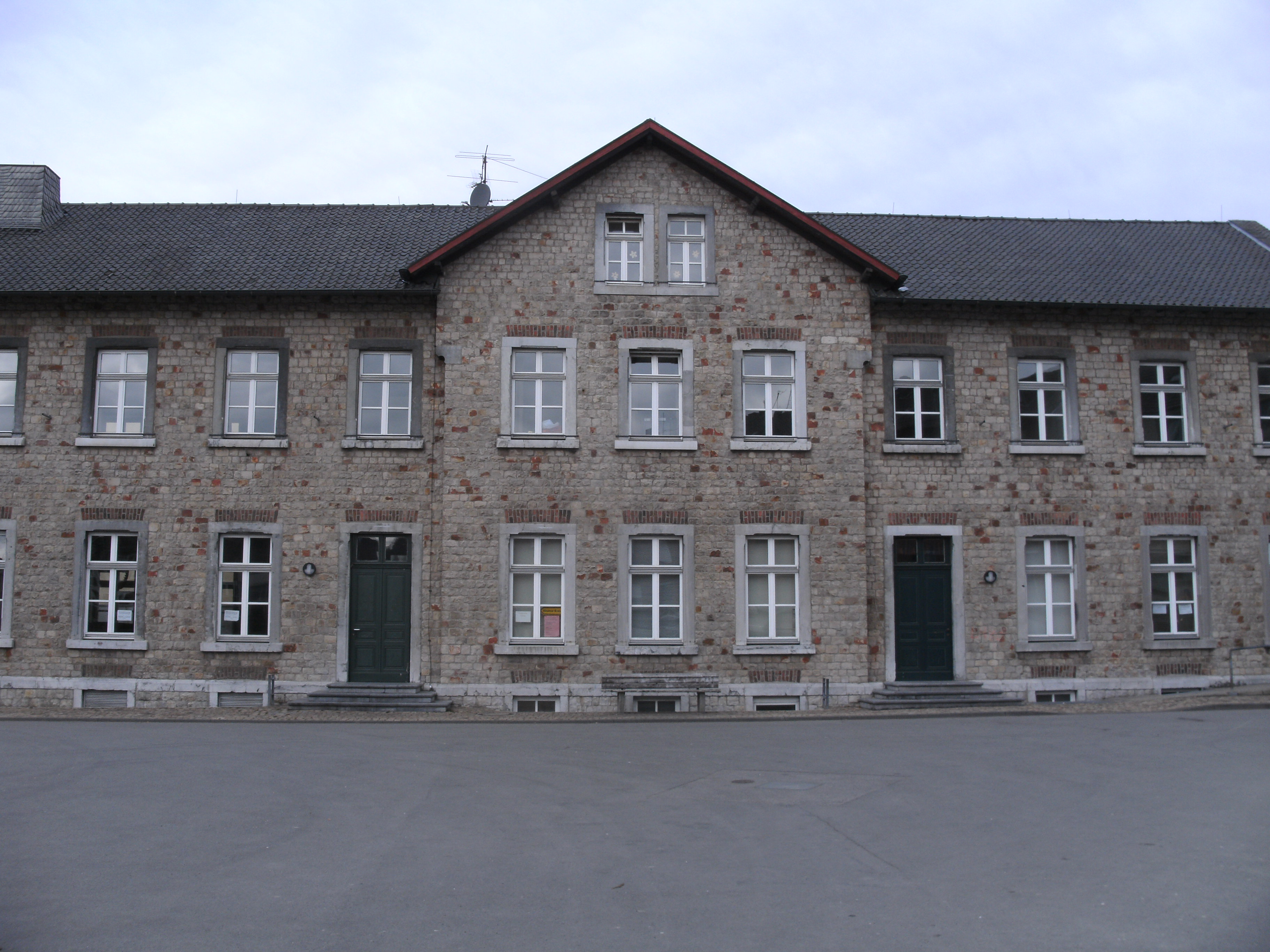
Old administration building

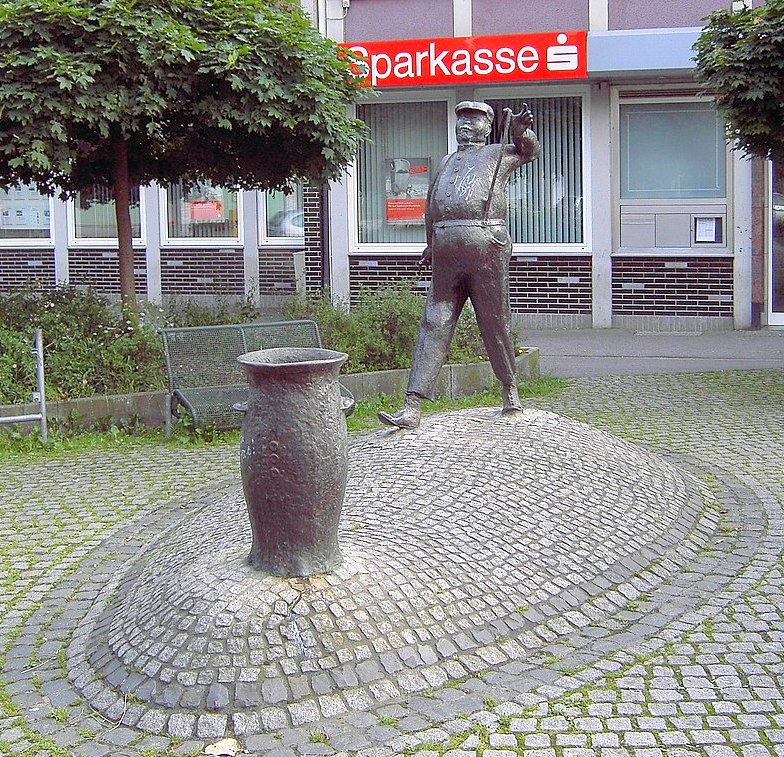
Memorial Barescheser

== Notable people ==
The well-known German singer and songwriter Christina Klein, better known under her stage name LaFee, was born in Büsbach.
