= Heul doch =

Single by LaFee

Single by LaFee

from the album Jetzt erst recht
- B-side: "Du bist schön"
- Released: 18 May 2007
- Recorded: 2007
- Genre: Alternative rock; hard rock
- Length: 4:02
- Label: EMI
- Songwriter(s): Bob Arnz, Gerd Zimmermann
- Producer(s): Bob Arnz

LaFee singles chronology
"Mitternacht" (2006)	"Heul doch" (2007)	"Beweg dein Arsch" (2007)

"Heul doch" (English: "Go ahead and cry") and "Shut Up" are rock songs by German singer LaFee. They were written by Bob Arnz and Gerd Zimmermann. The German version of the song, "Heul doch", appears on Lafee's 2007 second studio album Jetzt erst recht where it is the second track. It was released as the album's first single and reached number 3 in the German singles chart when released in May 2007.

The English-language version of the song, "Shut Up", later appeared on LaFee's third studio album Shut Up. It too was released as the albums' first single in 2008.

== "Shut Up" ==
"Shut Up"

Single by LaFee

from the album Shut Up
- Released: 23 May 2008
- Genre: Alternative rock; hard rock
- Length: 3:36 (single version); 4:00 (album version)
- Label: EMI
- Songwriter(s): Bob Arnz, Gerd Zimmermann

LaFee singles chronology
"Wer bin ich" (2007)	"Shut Up" (2008)	"Ring frei" (2008)

"Shut Up", an English version of "Heul doch", was released as LaFee's first English single in Europe on 23 May 2008. The music video premiered on 30 May 2008 on The Dome.

== Formats and track listing ==
"Heul doch" CD single

1. "Heul doch" (Video Version) - 3:49
2. "Mitternacht" (Live @ Echo) - 3:48

"Heul doch" CD maxi single

1. "Heul doch" (Single Version) - 3:36
2. "Heul doch" (Acoustic Version) - 3:02
3. "Du bist schön" - 3:27
4. "Heul doch" (Instrumental) - 4:01
5. "Documentary Snippet" (Enhanced Part)
6. "Fotoshooting Making of" (Enhanced Part)
7. "Videoshooting Making of" (Enhanced Part)

"Shut Up" CD single

1. "Shut Up" - 4:04
2. "Shut Up" (Single Version) - 3:36
3. "Shut Up" (Instrumental Version) - 4:04

== Charts ==
Chart (2007)^{1}	Peak position
Austrian Singles Chart	6
German Singles Chart	3
Swiss Singles Chart	25

Notes

- ^{1}: Chart positions of 2007 are of the German version, "Heul doch"

=== Year-end charts ===
Chart (2007)	Rank
German Singles Chart	47

== Certifications ==
Region	Certification	Certified units/sales
Germany (BVMI)	Gold	300,000^{‡}
^{‡} Sales+streaming figures based on certification alone.
