= Der Regen fällt =

Single by LaFee

from the album Best Of
- B-side: Remix
- Released: 13 November 2009
- Recorded: 2007 (Jetzt erst recht version); 2009 (2009 version)
- Genre: Alternative rock
- Length: 4:36 (2007); 3:54 (2009)
- Label: EMI
- Songwriter(s): Bob Arnz, Gerd Zimmermann, LaFee
- Producer(s): Bob Arnz

LaFee singles chronology
"Scheiss Liebe" (2009)	"Der Regen fällt" (2009)	"Ich bin" (2011)

"Der Regen fällt" (German for "The Rain Falls") is a song by German pop rock singer LaFee. It was written by Bob Arnz, Gerd Zimmermann and LaFee for her second studio album, Jetzt erst recht, and a new version of the song was released as the lead single of her best-of compilation album Best Of.

An English version of the song, "Lonely Tears", later appeared on her English-language album Shut Up.

== Track listing ==
These are the formats and track listings of major single releases of "Der Regen fällt".

- 2009 CD version two-track edition
1. "Der Regen fällt 2009" – 3:54
2. "Der Regen fällt (Akustik Goodbye Mix 2009)" – 2:54
