= Mitternacht (La Fee song) =

Single by LaFee

from the album LaFee
- B-side: "Alles ist neu"
- Released: 24 November 2006
- Genre: Alternative rock
- Label: EMI
- Songwriter(s): Bob Arnz, Gerd Zimmermann
- Producer(s): Bob Arnz

LaFee singles chronology
"Was Ist Das" (2006)	"Mitternacht" (2006)	"Heul doch" (2007)

"Mitternacht" (English: Midnight) is the fourth and last single from German singer LaFee's self-titled album LaFee. It was released in Germany on 24 November 2006. An English version of the song, entitled "Midnight Strikes", later appeared on LaFee's third studio album Shut Up.

== Music video ==
The music video premiered on 18 November 2006 on the German music show VIVA Live.

It was directed by Bastien Francois and was shot in Berlin, Germany. The video stays close to the song's theme of child abuse as it depicts LaFee as an angel who was sent to free a young girl, who is a victim of child abuse, from her abuser. It also features the members of LaFee's band who are depicted as clowns.

The video was nominated for "Best National Video" at the ECHO music awards in 2007.

== Track listing ==
CD Maxi Single

1. ""Mitternacht" (Video version) - 4:09
2. "Alles ist neu" - 3:47
3. "Du liebst mich nicht" - 4:41
4. "Wo bist du (Mama)" (Live version) - 5:37

Enhanced CD Maxi Single

1. "Mitternacht" (Album version) - 4:46
2. "Mitternacht" (Piano version) - 3:54
3. "Prinzesschen" (Live version) - 4:25
4. "Virus" (Live video) - 4:36
5. Backstage Material (Making of Secret Gig Kurzversion) - 3:59

== Charts ==
Chart (2006)	Peak position
Austrian Singles Chart	27
German Singles Chart	23
