= Scheiss Liebe =

Single by LaFee

from the album Ring frei
- B-side: "Für dich"
- Released: 6 March 2009
- Recorded: 2008
- Length: 3:43
- Label: EMI
- Songwriter(s): Bob Arnz, Gerd Zimmermann, LaFee
- Producer(s): Bob Arnz

LaFee singles chronology
"Ring frei" (2008)	"Scheiss Liebe" (2009)	"Der Regen fällt" (2009)

"Scheiss Liebe" is a song by German singer LaFee. It was written by Bob Arnz, Gerd Zimmermann and LaFee for her fourth studio album, Ring frei. The song is the album's fifth track and was released as the album's second single on 6 March 2009.

== Track listing ==
These are the formats and track listings of major single releases of "Scheiss Liebe".

- CD single: two-track edition
1. "Scheiss Liebe" (single version) – 3:43
2. "Für dich" (live) – 3:48

== Charts ==
Chart (2009)	Peak position
Austrian Singles Chart	63
German Singles Chart	44
