= Was ist das =

Single by LaFee

from the album LaFee
- B-side: "Warum"
- Released: 1 September 2006
- Label: EMI
- Songwriters: Bob Arnz, Gerd Zimmermann
- Producer: Bob Arnz

LaFee singles chronology
| "Prinzesschen" (2006) | "Was ist das" (2006) | "Mitternacht" (2006) |

"Was ist das" (English: What is That) is a song written by Bob Arnz and Gerd Zimmermann, and recorded by German singer LaFee. It was released as the third single from LaFee's album LaFee in September 2006. An English version of the song, entitled "What's Wrong with Me", later appeared on LaFee's third studio album Shut Up.

== Track listing ==
CD Maxi Single

1. "Was ist das" (Radio mix) - 3:22
2. "Was ist das" (Album mix) - 3:54
3. "Was ist das" (Hacienda mix) - 5:47
4. "Warum" - 3:35

== Charts ==
| Chart (2005) | Peak position |
|---|---|
| Austrian Singles Chart | 25 |
| German Singles Chart | 17 |
| Swiss Singles Chart | 59 |
