= Beweg dein Arsch (LaFee song) =

Single by LaFee

from the album Jetzt erst recht
- B-side: "Es tut weh"
- Released: 24 August 2007
- Recorded: 2007
- Genre: Alternative rock; Pop metal
- Length: 2:40
- Label: EMI
- Songwriter(s): Bob Arnz, Gerd Zimmermann
- Producer(s): Bob Arnz

LaFee singles chronology
"Heul doch" (2007)	"Beweg dein Arsch" (2007)	"Wer bin ich" (2007)

"Beweg dein Arsch" ("Move your ass") is a rock song written by Bob Arnz and Gerd Zimmermann for LaFee's 2007 second album Jetzt erst recht. The song is the album's fifth track, and was released as its second single. The single reached twenty two in the German Singles Charts when released in August 2007.

An English version of the song, entitled "Come On", later appeared on LaFee's third studio album Shut Up.

== Track listing ==
CD Single

1. "Beweg dein Arsch" (Radio Edit) - 2:40
2. "Beweg dein Arsch" (Instrumental) - 2:40

CD Maxi Single

1. "Beweg dein Arsch" (Single version) - 2:41
2. "Es tut weh" - 4:02
3. "Beweg dein Arsch" (Club mix) - 2:49
4. "Beweg dein Arsch: Directors Cut" (Enhanced part)
5. "Der Tanz zu "Beweg dein Arsch"" (Enhanced part)
6. "Documentary Snippet: Part 2" (Enhanced part)

== Charts ==
Chart (2007)	Peak position
Austrian Singles Chart	35
German Singles Chart	22
Swiss Singles Chart	87
