= Dorff =

Dorff is a surname, and may refer to:

- Daniel Dorff, American composer
- Elliot N. Dorff, American rabbi
- Eugene Dorff, American politician
- Paul Dorff, a German botanist and phycologist using the author abbreviation Dorff
- Stephen Dorff (born 1973), American actor
