= Wer bin ich =

Single by LaFee

from the album Jetzt erst recht
- B-side: "Krank"
- Released: 16 November 2007
- Recorded: 2007
- Genre: Alternative rock
- Length: 2:40
- Label: EMI
- Songwriter(s): Bob Arnz, Gerd Zimmermann
- Producer(s): Bob Arnz

LaFee singles chronology
"Beweg dein Arsch" (2007)	"Wer bin ich" (2007)	"Shut Up" (2008)

"Wer bin ich" (English: Who am I) is a rock song written by Bob Arnz and Gerd Zimmermann for LaFee's 2007 second album Jetzt erst recht. The song is the album's sixth track, and was released as its third single. The single reached 25 on the German Singles Charts when released in November 2007.

An English-language version of the song, "Tell Me Why", later appeared on LaFee's third studio album Shut Up.

== Track listing ==
CD single

1. "Wer bin ich" – 4:16
2. "Krank" – 2:10

CD maxi single

1. "Wer bin ich" (Single Version) – 4:17
2. "Wer bin ich" (Orchestral Version) – 4:28
3. "Wer bin ich" (Klassik Version) – 4:28
4. "Wer bin ich" (Album Version) – 4:28
5. "Wer bin ich" (Orchestral Instrumental) 4:26
6. "Wer bin ich" (Video) (Enhanced Part)
7. "Making Of Videodreh" [Part 2] (Enhanced Part)
8. "Fotogalerie" (Enhanced Part)

== Charts ==
Chart (2007)	Peak position
Austrian Singles Chart	41
German Singles Chart	25
MCM Top Rock (France)	2
