= Frei (album) =

Studio album by LaFee
- Released: 19 August 2011
- Genre: Pop
- Length: 40:56
- Label: Capitol
- Producer: Peter Hoffmann, David Bonk

LaFee chronology
Ring frei (2009)	Frei (2011)	Zurück in die Zukunft (2021)

Singles from Frei
- 1. "Ich bin" Released: 10 July 2011; 2. "Leben wir jetzt" Released: 11 November 2011

Frei is the fifth studio album by German pop rock singer LaFee. It was released on 19 August 2011 by Capitol Records as a follow-up to her successful Ring Frei (2009).

== Background ==
In an interview with German tabloid magazine Bild, LaFee said that this new album was really important to her because she has changed a lot since her previous album. She also explained the reasons behind this break; she said that she was tired of always being away from her home and her friends. She was just a teenager when she began her career and had grown up so fast, without time to think whether she had missed something or not. She was always being told what to do and need to be herself, not mentioning all the gossip that had run between her and her boyfriends. She admitted she could think about nothing but sleeping for days. So she had split with her old team, her old band and her old manager and had asked her label to change her contract and she was lucky because they said yes. Finally, she stated that now she's ready to come back with new songs (she wrote three songs by herself and co-wrote another two), themes closer to her like love and growing up and a new, more mature look.

== Singles ==
"Ich bin" was released as the album's lead single on 10 June 2011. It peaked at number 80 on the German and number 53 on the Austrian singles charts.

A second single, "Leben wir jetzt", was released on 11 November 2011. It did not chart.

== Track listing ==
The following track listing was confirmed by EMI.

No.	Title	Writer(s)	Producer(s)	Length
1.	"Herzlich willkommen"			2:36
2.	"Lass die Puppe tanzen"			2:38
3.	"Alles Gute"			3:29
4.	"Sonnensystem"			3:16
5.	"Du allein"			3:29
6.	"Ich bin"	Peter Hoffmann, David Bonk, Timo Sonnenschein, Jennifer Kästel	Peter Hoffmann, David Bonk	2:57
7.	"Fliegen mit mir"			2:39
8.	"7 Sünden"			3:15
9.	"Leben wir jetzt"			3:15
10.	"Phönix"			2:31
11.	"Sieh mich an"			2:54
12.	"Danke"			2:55
13.	"Ich hab dich lieb"			2:16

iTunes bonus tracks
No.	Title	Length
14.	"Ich lösch dich aus"	2:46
15.	"Ich bin" (video)	2:57
16.	"The Making of Frei" (video)	30:23

== Release history ==
Date	Region	Label
19 August 2011	Germany	Capitol Records
19 August 2011	Austria	Capitol Records
19 August 2011	Switzerland	Capitol Records
