= Jetzt erst recht =

Studio album by LaFee
- Released: 6 July 2007
- Recorded: 2007
- Genre: Alternative rock
- Length: 47:10
- Label: EMI
- Producer: Bob Arnz

LaFee chronology
LaFee (2006)	Jetzt erst recht (2007)	Shut Up (2008)

Alternative cover
- "Bravo Edition" of Jetzt erst recht

Singles from Jetzt erst recht
- 1. "Heul doch" Released: 2007; 2. "Beweg dein Arsch" Released: 2007; 3. "Wer bin ich" Released: 2007

Jetzt erst recht ("Now more than ever") is the second studio album recorded by German pop rock singer LaFee.

== Track listing ==
1. "Jetzt erst recht" – 4:09
2. "Heul doch" – 4:02
3. "Du bist schön" – 3:29
4. "Der Regen fällt" – 4:36
5. "Beweg dein Arsch" – 2:42
6. "Wer bin ich" – 4:29
7. "Küss mich" – 4:40
8. "Zusammen" – 4:05
9. "Stör ich" – 4:01
10. "Für dich" – 3:48
11. "Weg von dir" – 3:55
12. "Heiß" – 3:26

=== Bravo Edition ===
On 23 November 2007, a "Bravo Edition" of Jetzt erst recht was released, which contained the original songs in addition to several more.

13. "Es tut weh" – 4:02
14. "Warum" (Orchestra Version) – 3:57
15. "Der Regen fällt" (Orchestra Version) – 4:12
16. "Weg von dir" (Orchestra Version) – 3:53
17. "Wer bin ich" (Orchestra Version) – 4:28
18. "Sterben für dich" (Orchestra Version) – 3:03

== Charts ==
=== Weekly charts ===
Chart (2007)	Peak position
Austrian Albums (Ö3 Austria)	1
French Albums (SNEP)	79
German Albums (Offizielle Top 100)	1
Italian Albums (FIMI)	94
Swiss Albums (Schweizer Hitparade)	14

=== Year-end charts ===
Chart (2007)	Position
Austrian Albums (Ö3 Austria)	41
German Albums (Offizielle Top 100)	33

== Certifications ==
Certifications for Jetzt erst recht
Region	Certification	Certified units/sales
Austria (IFPI Austria)	Gold	10,000^{*}
Germany (BVMI)	Platinum	200,000^{^}
^{*} Sales figures based on certification alone.^{^} Shipments figures based on certification alone.
