= Virus (LaFee song) =

Single by LaFee

from the album LaFee
- B-side: "Du lebst"
- Released: 10 March 2006
- Genre: Alternative rock
- Label: EMI
- Songwriter(s): Bob Arnz, Gerd Zimmermann
- Producer(s): Bob Arnz

LaFee singles chronology
"Virus" (2006)	"Prinzesschen" (2006)

"Virus" is a song written by Bob Arnz and Gerd Zimmermann and recorded by German singer LaFee. It was released as the first single from LaFee's debut album LaFee. The single reached fourteen in both the German and Austrian Singles Charts when released in March 2006. An English version of the song, entitled "Scabies", later appeared on LaFee's third studio album Shut Up.

== Track listing ==
CD Maxi Single

1. "Virus" - 3:55
2. "Virus" (Akustik version) - 3:56
3. "Virus" (Radio edit) - 3:46
4. "Du lebst" - 4:24

== Charts ==
=== Weekly charts ===
Chart (2006)	Peak position
Austria (Ö3 Austria Top 40)	14
Germany (GfK)	14
Switzerland (Schweizer Hitparade)	70

=== Year-end charts ===
Chart (2006)	Position
Austria (Ö3 Austria Top 40)	54
Germany (Official German Charts)	68
