= Prinzesschen (song) =

Single by LaFee

from the album LaFee
- B-side: "Verboten"
- Released: 2 June 2006
- Genre: Alternative rock; doom metal
- Length: 4:28 (album version)
- Label: EMI
- Songwriter(s): Bob Arnz, Gerd Zimmermann
- Producer(s): Bob Arnz

LaFee singles chronology
"Virus" (2006)	"Prinzesschen" (2006)	"Was Ist Das" (2006)

"Prinzesschen" (English: Little Princess) is a song written by Bob Arnz and Gerd Zimmermann and recorded by German singer LaFee. It was released as the second single from Lafee's debut album LaFee. An English version of the song, entitled "Little Princess", later appeared on LaFee's third studio album Shut Up.

== Background and release ==
The song was included on LaFee's second greatest hits album, Best Of, released in 2023 through Telamo. The album features both the original single version and an 80s-inspired remix of the song.

== Music video ==
The music video for "Prinzesschen" incorporates elements from Snow White and Harry Potter. LaFee appears as a black angel, surrounded by fantasy-inspired visuals that align with the song's themes. The video reflects her interest in fairytales and fantasy, blending these motifs into its narrative.

== Live performances ==
"Prinzesschen" has frequently been used as the opening track for LaFee's concerts and has been a permanent part of her live performance setlists.

== Track listing ==
CD single / digital download / streaming

1. "Prinzesschen" – 4:28
2. "Prinzesschen" (Club version) – 4:23
3. "Prinzesschen" (Radio version) – 3:37
4. "Verboten" – 3:48

Digital download – Reloaded Version

1. "Prinzesschen" (Reloaded version) – 5:07

== Charts ==
=== Weekly charts ===
Chart (2006)	Peak position
Austria (Ö3 Austria Top 40)	10
Germany (GfK)	11
Switzerland (Schweizer Hitparade)	25

=== Year-end charts ===
Chart (2006)	Position
Austria (Ö3 Austria Top 40)	43
Germany (Official German Charts)	49

== Certifications ==
Region	Certification	Certified units/sales
Germany (BVMI)	Gold	300,000^{‡}
^{‡} Sales+streaming figures based on certification alone.
