= LaFee (album) =

Studio album by LaFee
- Released: 23 June 2006
- Recorded: July–October 2005
- Genre: Alternative rock; pop rock
- Length: 46:35
- Label: EMI
- Producer: Bob Arnz

LaFee chronology
LaFee (2006)	Jetzt erst recht (2007)

Singles from LaFee
- 1. "Virus" Released: 10 March 2006; 2. "Prinzesschen" Released: 2 June 2006; 3. "Was ist das" Released: 1 September 2006; 4. "Mitternacht" Released: 24 November 2006

LaFee is the debut album recorded by German pop rock singer LaFee.

== Track listing ==
All songs written by Bob Arnz and Gerd Zimmermann.

1. "Prinzesschen" – 4:18
2. "Virus" – 3:56
3. "Mitternacht" – 4:45
4. "Wo bist du (Mama)" – 4:41
5. "Verboten" – 3:47
6. "Halt mich" – 3:36
7. "Das erste Mal" – 3:18
8. "Du lebst" – 4:24
9. "Was ist das" – 3:55
10. "Lass mich frei" – 3:27
11. "Sterben für dich" – 2:58
12. "Wo bist du (Heavy Mix)" – 3:39

=== Special edition ===
13. "Warum" – 3:39

Special edition bonus DVD

- "Virus" (Karaoke Video) – 4:00
- "Prinzesschen" (Karaoke Video) – 3:50
- Making of "Virus"
- Photo gallery

=== Bravo edition ===
The "Bravo" edition does not include the track "Wo bist du (Heavy Mix)".

12. "Virus (Piano Version)" – 3:53
13. "Sterben für dich (Piano Version)" – 3:01
14. "Lass mich frei (Piano Version)" – 2:54
15. "Das erste Mal (Piano Version)" – 3:07
16. "Mitternacht (Piano Version)" – 3:01
17. "Warum" – 3:35

Bravo edition enhanced content

- "Virus" (Music Video)
- "Prinzesschen" (Music Video)
- "Was ist das" (Music Video: Online Version)
- "Mitternacht" (Music Video: Director's Cut Version)
- Photo gallery

== Charts ==
=== Weekly charts ===
Weekly chart performance for LaFee
Chart (2006)	Peak position
Austrian Albums (Ö3 Austria)	1
German Albums (Offizielle Top 100)	1
Swiss Albums (Schweizer Hitparade)	19

=== Year-end charts ===
Year-end chart performance for LaFee
Chart (2007)	Position
German Albums (Offizielle Top 100)	49

== Certifications ==
Certifications for LaFee
Region	Certification	Certified units/sales
Austria (IFPI Austria)	Platinum	30,000^{*}
Germany (BVMI)	3× Gold	300,000^{^}
^{*} Sales figures based on certification alone.^{^} Shipments figures based on certification alone.
