= Ring frei (song) =

Single by LaFee

from the album Ring frei
- B-side: "Hand in Hand"
- Released: 21 November 2008
- Recorded: 2008
- Genre: Pop metal
- Length: 3:31
- Label: EMI
- Songwriters: Bob Arnz, Gerd Zimmermann, LaFee
- Producer: Bob Arnz

LaFee singles chronology
"Shut Up" (2008)	"Ring frei" (2008)	"Scheiss Liebe" (2009)

Music video
- "Ring frei" on YouTube

"Ring frei" (English: Clear The Ring) is a song by German singer LaFee. It was written by Bob Arnz, Gerd Zimmermann and Lafee for her fourth studio album Ring frei. The song is the album's second track and it was released as the album's first single on 21 November 2008 .

== Music video ==
The music video premiered on 31 October 2008 on the German music show VIVA Live.

The video was written and directed by Bastien Francois, and was shot at the Cinegate studio in Berlin, Germany. It depicts Lafee as an action heroine, in which much of the scenes and costumes were based on costumes worn by Catherine Deane, played by Jennifer Lopez in The Cell and several other various action film characters such as Moon in Hero and Yu Shu-lien in Crouching Tiger, Hidden Dragon.

== Track listing ==
These are the formats and track listings of major single releases of "Ring Frei".

- CD single: 2 Track Edition
1. "Ring frei" (Single version) - 3:31
2. "Hand in Hand" - 4:22
- CD Single: Fan Edition
1. "Ring frei" (Album version) - 3:48
2. "Ring frei" (Making of the music video) - 24:33
3. "Lafee Interview" - 13:06
4. "Ring frei" (Studio performance) - 5:11
5. "Ring frei" (Karaoke video) - 3:54

== Charts ==
Chart (2008)	Peak position
Austrian Singles Chart	31
German Singles Chart	22

== Personnel ==
- Producer: Bob Arnz
- Publisher: Edition twoformusic/ EMI Music Publishing
- Vocals: LaFee
- Writers: Bob Arnz, Gerd Zimmermann, LaFee
- Management: Bob Arnz, Gabriele Geschwinder
- Photography: BITO
