= Ring frei (album) =

Studio album by LaFee
- Released: 2 January 2009
- Genre: Pop rock
- Label: Capitol
- Producer: Bob Arnz

LaFee chronology
Shut Up (2008)	Ring frei (2009)	Best Of - LaFee (2009)

Singles from LaFee
- 1. "Ring frei" Released: 21 November 2008; 2. "Scheiss Liebe" Released: 6 March 2009

Ring frei is the fourth studio album recorded by German singer LaFee. It was released as her third album in German on 2 January 2009.

== Track listing ==
All tracks are written by Bob Arnz, Gerd Zimmermann and LaFee.

No.	Title	Length
1.	"Intro"	1:12
2.	"Ring frei"	3:48
3.	"Eiskalter Engel"	3:51
4.	"Ein letztes Mal"	3:45
5.	"Scheiss Liebe"	3:42
6.	"Ich bin ich"	3:49
7.	"Angst"	3:09
8.	"Hand in Hand"	4:22
9.	"Nur das Eine"	4:04
10.	"Lieber Gott"	5:22
11.	"Was hat Sie"	3:48
12.	"Normalerweise"	3:54
13.	"Danke"	4:22

== Charts ==
Chart (2009)	Peak position
Austrian Albums Chart	5
German Albums Chart	6
Swiss Albums Chart	21
French Singles Chart	185

== Certifications ==
Certifications for Ring frei
Region	Certification	Certified units/sales
Austria (IFPI Austria)	Gold	10,000^{*}
^{*} Sales figures based on certification alone.^{^} Shipments figures based on certification alone.
