= The Dome (TV program) =

German television program

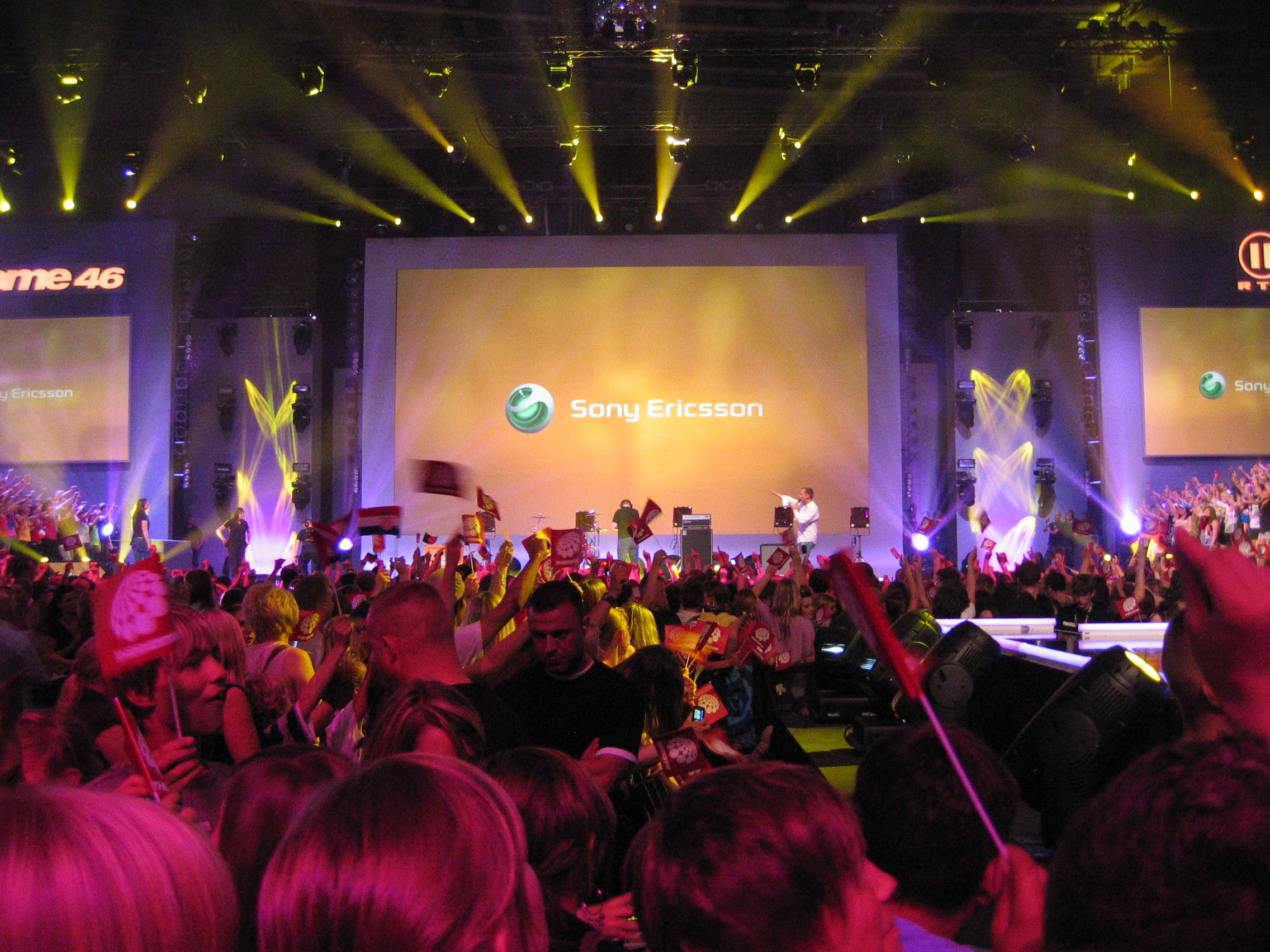
- The Dome 46 in Bremen
- Presented by: Daisy Dee (1997); Sebastian Radtke (1997–1998); Eva Habermann (1999); Daniel Hartwig (2000–2002); Yvonne Catterfeld (2003–2005) and numerous others
- Country of origin: Germany
- No. of episodes: 64

Production
- Executive producer: MME Entertainment
- Running time: 180 minutes

Original release
- Network: RTL2 (Viva, Super RTL)
- Release: 25 January 1997 – 30 November 2012

The Dome is a German television program and music event, produced and broadcast by RTL 2 from 1997 to 2012.

Roughly every three months, a new show was recorded in an event hall in different cities in Germany and Austria. In each episode, several national, but also international bands and musicians, perform their recent songs in front of a crowd of 5,000 to 15,000 people. Additionally, a compilation album was published when a new episode of The Dome was broadcast.
