= LaFee =

German singer and actress (born 1990)

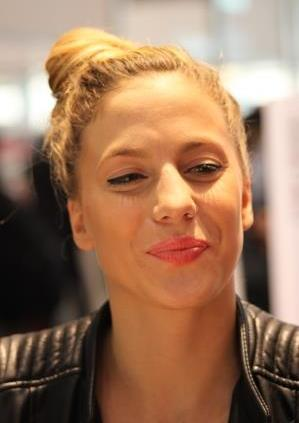
- LaFee in 2014
- Born: Christina Klein; 9 December 1990 (age 35); Büsbach, Stolberg, Germany
- Occupations: Singer, actress
- Spouse: Unknown (m. 2022)
- Children: 1
- Musical career
- Genres: Dance-pop; pop rock
- Years active: 2004–present
- Labels: EMI (2005–2009); Capitol (2010–2012); Fairay (2012–2017); Comude (2018); Telamo (2020–present)
- Website: lafee.de

Christina Klein (born 9 December 1990), better known by her stage name LaFee, is a German pop singer and television actress who has sold more than one million records worldwide. She is most famous in mainland Europe, particularly in German-speaking countries.

Since 2006, LaFee released six studio albums, three of them with her band. Both the debut album and the successor Jetzt erst recht (2007) reached the top of the album charts in Germany, Austria and Switzerland.

== Early life ==
Klein was born in Büsbach, a district in the town of Stolberg, to a German father, Bernd Klein, and a Greek mother, Keriakoulla. She is the younger of two children. She has an older brother, Andreas.

At the age of nine, Klein began sending out demo tapes to television shows, leading her to perform on three of them. She participated in Kiddy Contest, an Austrian children's TV singing competition, in September 2004 at the age of 13, performing "Handy", a parody of Barry Manilow's "Mandy". It was this television appearance that led to her being discovered by German music producer Bob Arnz. Then she worked on her first album.

== Career ==
=== 2005–2008: Successful debut and second album ===
LaFee's first single "Virus" was released in 2006 from her debut album LaFee. Since the start of her career, LaFee was supported by the magazine Bravo and the music channel VIVA. "Virus" reached No. 13 on both the German and Austrian singles chart and her second single, "Prinzesschen" ("Little Princess"), reached rank 11 in the German charts. "Was ist das" ("What is that") and "Mitternacht" ("Midnight") also charted in the German and Austrian charts.

LaFee released her second album, Jetzt erst recht ("Now more than ever") on 6 July 2007, and the album's lead single, "Heul doch" ("Keep crying"), in 2007. The song reached the German top 10. The album Jetzt erst recht charted in the Italian albums chart at No. 94 and in the French albums chart at No. 79. It went Platinum in Germany and Gold in Austria.

Her acting debut was on Nina's Welt, which was broadcast from November 2006 until the spring of 2007. Later, she made an appearance on the German soap opera Gute Zeiten, schlechte Zeiten ("Good times, bad times"). Her biggest gig was on New Year's Eve 2006 at the Brandenburg Gate, with more than one million viewers. On 25 August 2007, LaFee had a gig as a part of the open-air events at the Brandenburg Gate in front of 119,000 people.

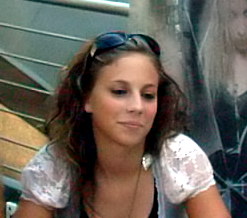
LaFee in 2006

The second single was "Beweg dein Arsch" ("Move your ass"), which charted at No. 21 on the German charts. On 16 November 2007, LaFee released the third single, "Wer bin ich" ("Who am I"), which reached No. 25 on the German singles chart and No. 41 on the Austrian singles chart.

In addition, she has received the Echo award for "Best Female Singer", Bravo Gold Otto award for "Best Pop Female Singer" and the Jetix Kids' award for "Best Solo Act". The album was also re-released as a Bravo special edition with bonus songs in November 2008.

=== 2008–2009: First English album and Ring frei ===
LaFee's first English-language album, Shut Up, was released in 2008. It includes songs from the album LaFee and Jetzt erst recht in English. The first single, "Shut Up", is the English version of "Heul doch". "Shut Up" reached number 93 in the German singles chart, which was the lowest chart entry by LaFee. The album, with more than 100,000 copies at the time, was also the weakest LaFee album. It reached No. 21 on the German albums chart and No. 31 on the Austrian albums chart. The song "Shut Up" was first performed on 30 May 2008 at the music festival The Dome.

LaFee's first single, "Ring frei" ("Clear the ring"), from her fourth studio album, Ring frei, was released on 21 November 2008 and reached No. 22 in Germany. The album Ring frei was released in Germany on 2 January 2009 and reached No. 6 on the German albums chart, No. 21 on the Swiss albums chart and No. 5 on the Austrian albums chart. The album has also received gold status in Austria and has worldwide more than 100,000 sales. LaFee went on a tour in Germany, Austria and Switzerland in 2009. After the promotion of the tour, she took a break for the first time briefly.

Her first greatest hits collection, Best Of, was released in November 2009. The album is available as "Day Edition" with one CD and as "Night Edition" with two CDs. The album was a clear failure. A re-recorded version of "Der Regen fällt", which originally appeared on her second studio album, Jetzt erst recht, was released as the lead single of the compilation. The song only reached rank 94 in the German singles chart. In Austria and Switzerland, it failed to chart. LaFee subsequently left her manager Bob Arnz. Her musicians left the group in December 2009 with an announcement on their websites to form a new project, due to different musical orientations.

=== 2011–2012: Frei ===
On 4 June 2011, LaFee presented a new single, "Ich bin" ("I Am"), at the German show The Dome. It was available on 10 June 2011, and EMI stated on its official site that her new album Frei would be released on 1 July 2011.

In an interview with the German tabloid magazine Bild, LaFee said that this new album was very important to her because she had changed a lot since her previous album. She further explained the reasons behind this break; saying that she was tired of always being away from home and her friends. She was just a teenager when she began her career and had grown up so fast, without time to think whether she had missed something or not. She admitted she could think about nothing but sleeping for days. So she had split with her old team, her old band and her old manager, and had asked her label to change her contract and she was lucky because they agreed. Finally, she stated that now she's ready to come back with new songs (she wrote three songs by herself and co-wrote another two), themes closer to her like love and growing up with a new, more mature look.

Until the end of March 2012, LaFee took part in the KiKa show Dein Song as a music sponsor. Her song "Zeig dich!" was the theme song for the movie Hanni & Nanni 2. It was released as a single on 11 May 2012. The song did not reach a chart position.

In September 2012, LaFee appeared in the German edition of the men's magazine Playboy. She also released the single "Flip Flop (Can't Help Myself)". This was a free download in September 2012 from the Playboy website; the first 10,000 visitors of the site were able to download this one-track file for free.

From mid-November to late December 2012, LaFee played the role of "Angel" and "Belle" in the musical Vom Geist der Weihnacht (A Christmas Carol) in Essen.

=== 2014–2018: Acting, biography and new songs ===
From 22 October 2014 to 23 October 2017, LaFee played the role of Iva Lukowski in the RTL soap opera Alles was zählt.

On 14 November 2014, her biography Frei was released, which was co-written with German author Anne van Straelen.

As of 2015, a total of eight new songs appeared, which were presented in Alles was zählt by her series role Iva Lukowski. Among them was the song "Was bleibt", with which LaFee was able to place in the German single charts for the first time in four years in March 2015.

On 16 November 2018, her single "Karthenhaus" was released, including a music video. The single did not reach a chart position.

=== 2020–present: Comeback album Zurück in die Zukunft ===
In July 2020, it was announced via LaFee's Instagram account that she is back in the recording studio with producer Christian Geller.

On 26 February 2021, the single "(Ich bin ein) Material Girl", a cover version of Madonna's "Material Girl", was released. Her fifth studio album, titled Zurück in die Zukunft ("Back to the Future"), was initially announced for May 2021 and then postponed until August, and will be distributed by the music label Telamo, which specializes in schlager and folk music. LaFee made her first official appearance in ten years on 27 February in the ARD show Schlagerchampions.

On 30 April, a second single, "Halt mich fest", was released. It is a German-language cover version of "Take On Me" by a-ha. The music video for it premiered on YouTube on the same day and is based on the original video.

On 20 August 2021, LaFee's fifth studio album, Zurück in die Zukunft ("Back to the Future"), was released after more than ten years. The limited fan box includes merchandising (poster, autograph card) and an additional CD called Zurück in die Vergangenheit ("Back to the Past"), which contains earlier songs by LaFee in a new sound and with modified lyrics. Among them are "Virus", "Prinzesschen" and "Heul doch". On "Virus", all the insults were rewritten.

With the album, LaFee was able to reach the top 10 (number 7) of the album charts again after 12 years. Ring frei last landed at number 6 in the charts in January 2009.

== Discography ==
LaFee's old logo, used till 2010

- 2006: LaFee
- 2007: Jetzt erst recht
- 2008: Shut Up
- 2009: Ring frei
- 2011: Frei
- 2021: Zurück in die Zukunft
- 2025: Schatten & Licht

== Filmography ==
LaFee has acted in the German soap opera Gute Zeiten, schlechte Zeiten on RTL. She played a girl who has come back to her ex-boyfriend. The ex-boyfriend is also the boy in her video for "Heul doch" ("Shut Up").

- 2006–2007: Ninas Welt
- 2008: Gute Zeiten, schlechte Zeiten
- 2012: Hanni & Nanni 2
- 2014–2017: Alles was zählt

== Awards ==
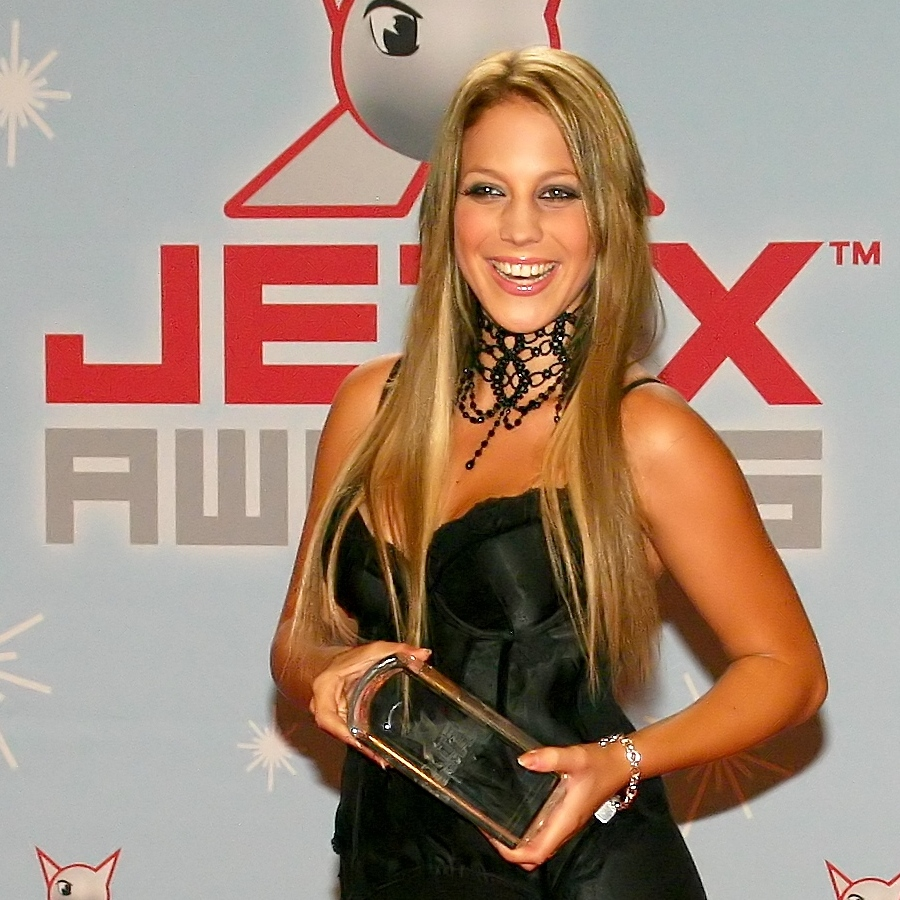
LaFee at the 2008 Jetix awards in Berlin

- 2008
  - Echo Award for Best Female Singer
  - Bravo Gold-Otto for Best Female Pop Singer
  - Jetix Kids' Award for Best Solo Act
- 2007
  - Echo Award for Best Female Singer
  - Echo Award for Best Female Newcomer
  - Bravo Silver-Otto for Best Female Pop Singer
  - Goldene Stimmgabel
  - Kids' Choice Award for Favorite Singer
  - Jetix Kids' Award for Hottest Singer

== Other ==
- 2007: LaFee – Das erste Mal (book) by Michael Fuchs-Gamböck and Thorsten Schatz
- 2007: Bravo-LaFee-Special#1
