= Anne Shongwe =

Kenyan entrepreneur and UN civil servant (born 1964)

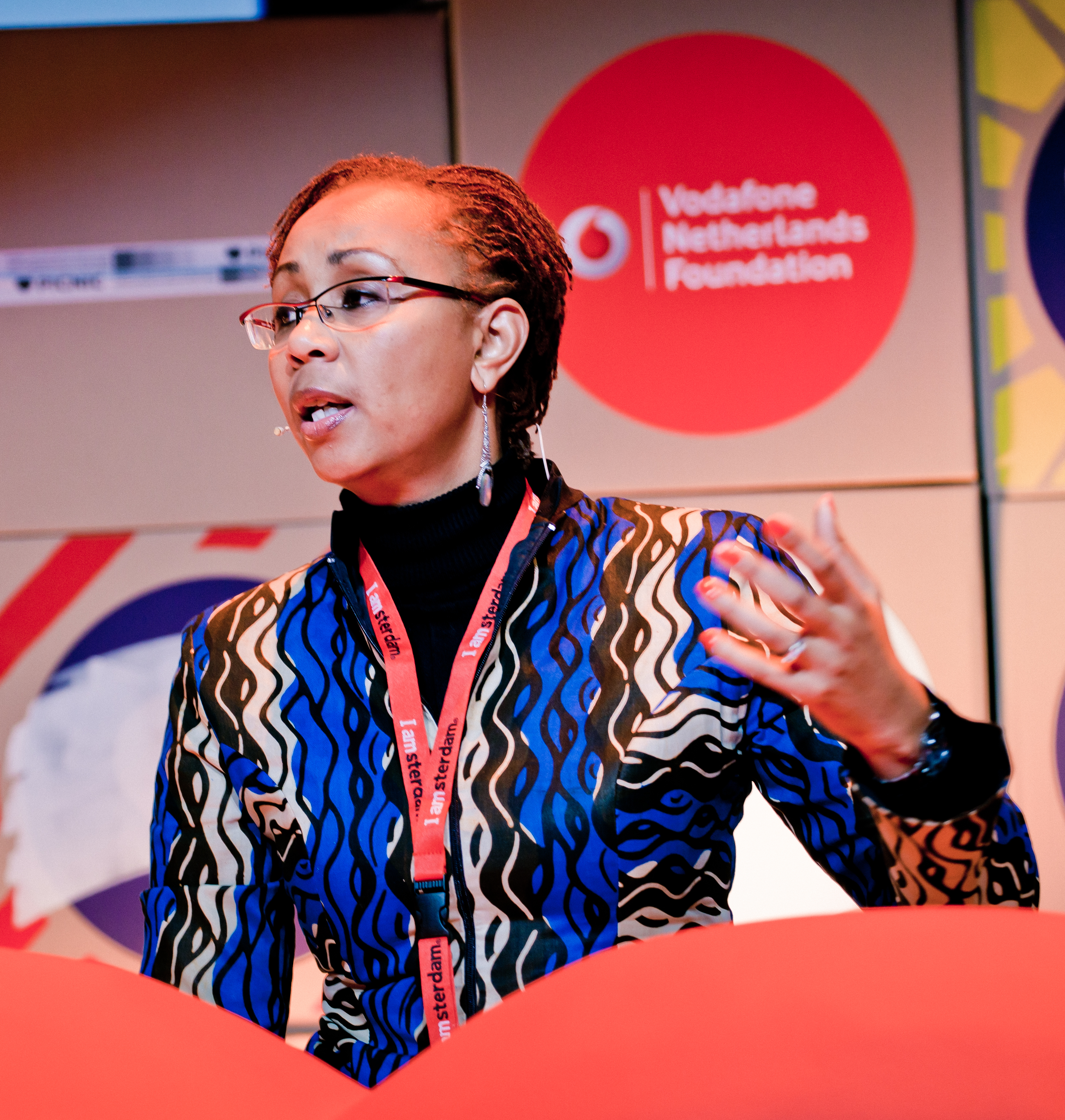
- Shongwe in 2012
- Born: Anne Muthoni Githuku; 1964 (age 61–62); Kenya
- Other names: Anne Githuku, Anne Githuku-Shongwe, Anne Muthoni Githuku-Shongwe
- Occupations: International civil servant and entrepreneur
- Years active: 1993–present
- Known for: Afroes

Anne Shongwe (also known as Anne Githuku-Shongwe, born 1964) is a Kenyan international civil servant and entrepreneur, who has lived for three decades in South Africa. Since 2022, she has been the director of the Joint United Nations Programme on HIV/AIDS (UNAIDS) for Southern Africa. She was born in Kenya and then completed a bachelor's degree at St. Lawrence University in Canton, New York, and a master's degree at American University in Washington, D.C. She spent fifteen years working with the United Nations Development Programme (UNDP) and then launched a digital gaming development business to create a learning platform for teaching life skills to youth through mobile phones. Using sponsorships from various corporations and NGOs, Shongwe was able to distribute games as free downloads with a focus on Africa. Her games were designed to teach youth about human rights and social responsibilities. She aimed through the games to have youth question their beliefs in regard to topics such as sexual consent, exploitation and violence; environmental protection; and conflict resolution.

Shongwe's first two games, Champ Chase and Teka Champs, led to her selection as a finalist in the Cartier Women's Initiative Awards in 2010 and allowed her to open a second office in Nairobi. Her next games Haki 1: Shield and Defend and Moraba each won their categories at the World Summit Youth Awards in 2012 while Moraba also won a Meffy Award from the Mobile Entertainment Forum in London. Shongwe was selected that year for Paris's Netexplo Award and as a finalist for the Mobile Premier Award in Barcelona, Spain. In 2013, she was named a Social Entrepreneur of the Year by the Schwab Foundation and World Economic Forum. Haki 2: Chaguo Ni Lako won the PeaceApp Award in 2015 from the UNDP and United Nations Alliance of Civilizations. That year she launched Job Hunt, a game designed to teach players about financial literacy and employment.

In 2016, Shongwe returned to the United Nations and worked for five years as the Southern African Representative for UN Women. Her office was headquartered in South Africa and her responsibility included implementing programmes to promote women's empowerment and equality throughout Botswana, Eswatini, Lesotho, Namibia, and South Africa. Much of her work focused on educating women about reproductive health and HIV/AIDS and the role power inequalities play in increasing sexual exploitation, unintentional pregnancy, child marriage, and infection from sexually transmitted diseases. She also focused on the development of women-owned businesses and reducing inequalities in the workplace. In 2022, she began working for UNAIDS with the goal of eradicating AIDS in Africa by 2030 by ensuring that those infected with HIV received treatment and were therefore unable to transmit the virus.

== Early life, education, and family ==
Anne Muthoni Githuku was born in 1964 in Kenya, to Mary Wambui (née Kuguru) and John Waruri Githuku. Her mother was a primary school teacher before becoming a writer and entrepreneur, and her maternal grandfather was Davidson Ngibuini Kuguru, former member of parliament for the Mathira Constituency and Minister of Home Affairs. Her father was also a teacher before becoming a civil servant. He served as the Permanent Secretary of Planning and National Development and also as Permanent Secretary of Commerce and Industry. Githuku had three brothers, Tony, David, and Patrick, and one sister, Rose. Education was a priority for the family and Mary and John not only ensured their own children's education, but helped other needy students obtain an education. Githuku attended university in Canton, New York, graduating in 1987 from St. Lawrence University. She pursued further studies, earning a master's degree from the American University of Washington, D.C. in international development in 1991. Githuku married Keith Mantayi Shongwe, with whom she had three children, Zawadi, Malaika, and Kwezi Shongwe.

== Career ==
=== International development (1993–2008) ===
Shongwe began working for the United Nations Development Programme (UNDP) in South Africa in 1993. Her work for UNDP involved coordinating national programmes on the response to HIV/AIDS, addressing poverty, and evaluating inequality and gender issues. In 2001, she became the policy advisor for Southern Africa on the HIV/AIDS challenges in Africa. Presenting a paper, Drawing Linkages between Gender, Poverty and HIV/AIDS, in 2003 at a meeting on gender mainstreaming and poverty reduction strategies held in Pretoria, Shongwe stated that research had shown that poverty made women and girls between the ages of 19 and 20 six times more likely than similarly aged men to become infected with HIV because of their dependence on engaging in the sex trade or providing sexual favours for their livelihoods. She continued that the loss of workers, either because they were infected by HIV/AIDS or were engaged in caregiving, had heightened food shortages and lowered family incomes while decreasing the ability of governments to meet developmental goals. Working under regional efforts to create solutions for the AIDS epidemic, Shongwe was one of the editors of the book, Turning a Crisis into an Opportunity: Strategies for Scaling up the National Response to the HIV/AIDS Pandemic in Lesotho (2004). Professor Courtenay Sprague described it as a manual to prevent people who are uninfected from becoming infected and to assure that those who have the virus receive proper care and treatment. Sprague lauded the innovations the book proposed and the fact that it was written by Africans, but was critical of its lack of discussion on how to finance treatment and implement strategies, as people in the country could not normally afford the costs involved, and questioned whether national laws and policies were in-line with the proposed goals.

=== Games developer (2008–present) ===
In 2005, Shongwe worried about the amount of time her son was spending playing video games. She was also concerned at the negative messaging about Africa in Western media and the lack of positive platforms for youth to learn about the continent. When she realised her son was learning history while playing the game Civilization, Shongwe decided that she wanted to try to develop video games as an educational tool. Her mother was confused as to why she wanted to leave stable employment with the United Nations, but Shongwe felt that it would allow her to make a positive change without having to deal with all the bureaucracy involved in international development work. It took her three years to exit the UNDP and establish her company Afroes, (a combination of the words African and Heroes and Heroines). Lack of access in Africa to computers, the internet or video game consoles led Shongwe into developing games for mobile phones, which were widely used. She spent 2008 researching how to develop a business model for making high-quality yet affordable games for mobile phones. She studied the video gaming industry in South Africa and Kenya and attended gaming conferences in New York. She furthered her studies at the University of Cape Town Graduate School of Business, earning a certificate in social innovation and attended Harvard University to study social entrepreneurship and Jones International University of Centennial, Colorado to study management.

Shongwe hired recent university graduates in 2009, to help her design a business plan and began to engage with producers to commission games. Partnerships with organisations including the Ford Foundation, the Kellogg Foundation, Nokia, and Vodafone, allowed games to be developed which could be offered as free downloads to consumers. She worked with the Nelson Mandela Children's Fund Champions for Children to produce the game Champ Chase, which was launched to coincide with the 2010 FIFA World Cup championship. Champ Chase′s message was to raise awareness of sexual predation against children and promote the use of helpline numbers. The game focused on players saving children from potentially harmful people and situations. The second game she developed, with gamer Mxolisi Sakhile Xaba, was Teka Champs. Using information she learned from speaking with African footballers, the game allowed children to play soccer in various African townships with skill sets that real players had developed. Her work to use games as a focus on human rights and social change led Shongwe to become one of three African finalists in the Cartier Women's Initiative Awards in 2010. The success of these first games allowed her to partner with UN Women's Southern Africa & Indian Ocean Islands division to create a game on preventing gender-based violence. Working again with Xaba, Afroes produced Moraba in 2011, which allowed players to progress in the game by completing quizzes designed to improve awareness of sexual health and attitudes about sexual violence. The questions were created to make players evaluate their values and attitudes about sexual consent, and what constitutes abuse and rape.

The success of these games led Shongwe to open a second office in Nairobi. Working with Nathan Masyuko, Wesley Kirinya, and artist Chief Nyamweya, in 2011 Afroes developed Haki 1: Shield and Defend, (Haki means "justice" in Swahili), which focuses on environmental rights and allows players to protect trees from illegal loggers. Two games developed by Afroes, Haki 1 and Moraba won their categories, respectively Go Green and Power 2 Women, at the World Summit Youth Awards held in Montreal, Canada, in 2012. That year, Moraba was selected as the winner in the category of Social Responsibility and Development for London's Meffy Awards, presented by the Mobile Entertainment Forum. Shongwe was selected as one of the ten laureates who received the 2012 Netexplo Award, given by the Netexplo Observatory, Paris, and she was one of three African finalists at the Mobile World Congress in Barcelona, Spain, for the Mobile Premier Awards given by Apps Circus. Also that year, Haki 2: Chaguo Ni Lako (Swahili for "the choice is yours") was developed in response to an upcoming election. The 2008 elections in Kenya had triggered social unrest and rioting and the game presented alternatives to civic engagement by presenting puzzles and quizzes about ethics, human rights, and leadership aimed at educating voters to resolve conflicts through peaceful interactions.

In 2013, Shongwe was one of two Africans, the other being Njideka Harry of Nigeria, who were distinguished as Social Entrepreneurs of the Year by the Schwab Foundation and World Economic Forum. Haki 2 received the 2015 PeaceApp Award from the UNDP and United Nations Alliance of Civilizations initiative which recognises digital games that promote conflict resolution and peacebuilding. Shongwe wanted to develop a new game which taught financial literacy. Working with Digital Jobs Africa, in 2015 she developed Job Hunt, a role-playing game, which allows players to engage as online workers. Players compete for positions, earn income for tasks completed on time, and learn skills, such as managing resources. The game was launched in Kenya, Nigeria, and South Africa. Scholars such as Jolene Fisher have analysed the use of games for civic learning. Of Moraba, Fisher said that it focused on gender inequality and looked at human and legal rights for both men and women, rather than only for women, but that it did not discuss systemic biases in power dynamics. Looking at the Haki series, Fisher lauded the message fostered by the games that Kenya's salvation comes from within Kenya, rather than from rescue by outsiders. In evaluating Haki 2, she stated that players who engaged in sessions of the game at school and with organisations during Lagos Social Media Week reported enjoying the game and learning information from playing that they did not previously know. Further analysis of responses, however, showed that players were more active in the puzzle-solving portions of the game than in quizzes, which contained educational content. Despite these shortcomings, Fisher noted that the game served as a "catalyst for generating conversations" about contentious issues in society in various community outreach projects.

=== International development (2016–present) ===
In 2016, Shongwe returned to the United Nations and became the UN Women representative, in the South Africa Multi-Country Office (SAMCO). Her office was headquartered in South Africa and her responsibility included implementing programmes to promote women's empowerment and equality throughout Botswana, Lesotho, Namibia, South Africa and Swaziland, (now Eswatini). Among the issues that she prioritised were gender-based violence and inequalities in power relationships. In 2017, she was named one of the inaugural Pond's-Vital Voices fellows, in a new initiative created between the skincare brand and the women's empowerment organisation to help leaders network and improve their global outreach in improving environmental, social, and human rights change. At the Higher Education Aids National Youth Conference that year, she addressed the problem of trading sex for marks on university campuses. She noted the links between the cost of obtaining an education and HIV infections, stating that students who struggled to pay for their studies were often the target of instructors who used their vulnerability to demand sex, making students more prone to contracting the virus. Students at the conference suggested the ]creation of an app that would allow them to communicate about instructors who abused their power. Shongwe agreed to analyse the suggestion but cautioned that if a system was implemented, verification processes would need to be put in place. Other issues she worked on were building leadership skills for women, the development of women-owned businesses, and the reduction of inequalities and sexual harassment in the workplace. Of particular interest were changes to government programmes aimed at growing large businesses, as they excluded small and micro-enterprises engaged in by women entrepreneurs. Shongwe stressed that large businesses have a finite ability to employ workers based on company needs, but economies could be positively changed by assisting hundreds of thousands of firms that employ only one person. She also focused on access to health and social services, particularly those that dealt with reproductive health including unintentional pregnancy, childhood marriage, and HIV prevention.

In 2022, Shongwe became the regional director for East and South Africa of the Joint United Nations Programme on HIV/AIDS (UNAIDS). She partnered with Jacqueline Nzisabira, the Regional Policy Advisor for UN Women in Eastern and Southern Africa in 2023, in an initiative to educate women about local resources available for them to fund programmes and use resources to protect the health of their local communities. They noted that traditional norms and practices, as well as power inequalities, often left women out of policy development strategies and focused on biomedical solutions. The programme aimed to support grassroots activists in tailoring responses to the HIV crisis to local conditions. Shongwe stated that poverty, inter-generational relationships, sex work, and violence cause higher infection rates for women, but also stressed that men were less likely to be tested or treated, and if they sought treatment were less likely to continue with long-term care. She urged continued diligence in the region, stating at the end of 2023 that Botswana, Eswatini, Rwanda, Tanzania and Zimbabwe were on the path towards meeting the goal of eliminating AIDS by 2030 because 95 percent of those living with HIV were in treatment and had reached the stage where the virus could no longer be transmitted.

== Selected works ==
=== Written works ===
- Kimaryo, Scholastica Sylvan; Githuku-Shongwe, Anne; Okpaku, Joseph O.; Feeney, Joseph, eds. (2004). Turning a Crisis into an Opportunity: Strategies for Scaling Up the National Response to the HIV/AIDS Pandemic in Lesotho. New Rochelle, New York: Third Press Publishers. ISBN 978-0-89388-236-5.
- Shongwe, Anne (2013). "38. An Entrepreneurial Public Service". In Wakhungu-Githuku, Susan (ed.). 50 Years since Independence: Where Is Kenya? (PDF). Nairobi, Kenya: Footprints Press. pp. 304–311. ISBN 978-9966-022-11-0.
- Githuku-Shongwe, Anne (2021). "Unbowed Pathways to Social Justice, Lightened on the Shoulders of Women before Us". In January-Bardill, Nozipho (ed.). Write To Speak: A Collection of Stories Written by African Women Leaders. Johannesburg, South Africa: Bardill & Associates. pp. 323–334. ISBN 978-0-620-94181-5.

=== Games ===
- Shongwe, Anne (2009). Champ Chase (mobile) (game). South Africa: Afroes Company Ltd, Nelson Mandela Children's Fund Champions for Children. Archived from the original on 11 February 2024.
- Shongwe, Anne; Xaba, Mxolisi (2009). TekaChamps (mobile) (game). South Africa: Afroes Company Ltd.
- Shongwe, Anne; Xaba, Mxolisi Sakhile (2010). Moraba (mobile) (game). South Africa: Afroes Company Ltd, UN Women Southern Africa & Indian Ocean Islands. Archived from the original on 25 January 2023.
- Shongwe, Anne; Masyuko, Nathan Muema (2011). Haki 1: Shield and Defend (mobile) (game). Kenya: Afroes Company Ltd. Archived from the original on 11 February 2024.
- Anne Shongwe (2012). Haki 2: Chaguo Ni Lako (mobile) (game). Kenya: Afroes Company Ltd, Tuvuke Initiative. Archived from the original on 2 April 2016.
- Anne Shongwe (2015). JobHunt (mobile) (game). Kenya: Afroes Company Ltd. Archived from the original on 17 May 2023.
