= Kanjuri High School =

Coordinates: 0.406105°S 37.148969°E

- Karatina; Kenya

Information
- Motto: Strive for Excellence
- Established: 1964
- Principal: P.C.Gachoka
- Nickname: Kanchez.

Kanjuri High School is a secondary school located at Kanjuri area, Gatei Sublocation in Karatina, Mathira Constituency, Nyeri County (former Nyeri district in Central Province) in Kenya. The School is currently a boy's high school offering Kenya Secondary Education for Form 1, 2, 3, & 4. It is categorized as an extra secondary county school in Kenya.

== History ==
It was started in 1964, a year after Kenya gained her independence. The school was started by the community of the village surrounding it by donating land on which the school now stands. Currently the school is sponsored by the Presbyterian Church of East Africa. The name "kanjuri" comes from a Kikuyu dance called "njuri". Part of the school land was a public land on which the dance was being performed.

In its early years, that is before 1999, the school was a mixed day and boarding school. The school is now a boy's boarding school delivering the 8-4-4 syllabus which is tested nationwide by the Kenya National Examination Council.

== Location ==
The school is located about 14 km (8.7 mi) from Karatina, on the foot of Mount Kenya. The locality experiences a cool weather round the year. The terrain is a hilly one which makes the area suitable for tea growing.

== Curriculum ==
The school offers High School (equivalent of O-Level) education in the subjects of Mathematics, English, Kiswahili, Physics, Chemistry, Biology, Geography, History and Government, Christian Religious Education, Business studies, Agriculture, and Computer studies. A student is required to sit for a minimum of seven and a maximum of ten to qualify for admission to a public university by KUCCPS.
