= Ephraim Maina =

Kenyan politician

Ephraim Mwangi Maina is a Kenyan politician and Member of Parliament. He belongs to Safina, and was elected to represent Mathira Constituency in the National Assembly of Kenya in the 2007 Kenyan parliamentary election.

Maina is the founder and owner of Kirinyaga Construction, a construction company in Kenya.
