= Video games in Kenya =

The video game industry is a young industry in Kenya. Though various start-up companies have appeared in the country since 2007, the existing businesses are dealing with funding issues and few successes have been made. However, shared spaces, support programs and government grants introduced over the past few years have allowed the industry to grow large in a short period of time. The introduction of broadband internet in 2009 spawned a generation of young ICT savvy people in the country and the Kenyan game industry is as of 2015 among the largest in Africa.

== History ==
The earliest known game development in Kenya was around 2007, when independent game designer Wesley Kirinya worked alone on Adventures of Nyangi, a "crude" action-adventure video game inspired by Tomb Raider. Despite the game's low quality, it gained a large amount of press coverage for being among the first video games created on the African continent. Kirinya later joined with Ghanaian game developer Eyram Tawia to form the company Leti Games, which was rebranded as Leti Arts in 2013.

In November 2007, NexGen was formed, a company by video game enthusiasts Nathan Masyuko and Ayub Makimei. Inspired in the mid-'90s by the Nintendo Entertainment System and works of Hideo Kojima, Masyuko built a gaming center in 2009 from where the company hosts gaming tournaments. NexGen has been taking efforts to get esports off the ground in Kenya, with limited success. In 2010, Planet Rackus formed. The company released Ma3Racer on the Nokia Ovi Store, expecting around 10,000 downloads over a year, but the game became popular with its primarily African audience was downloaded over 900,000 times within that time span.

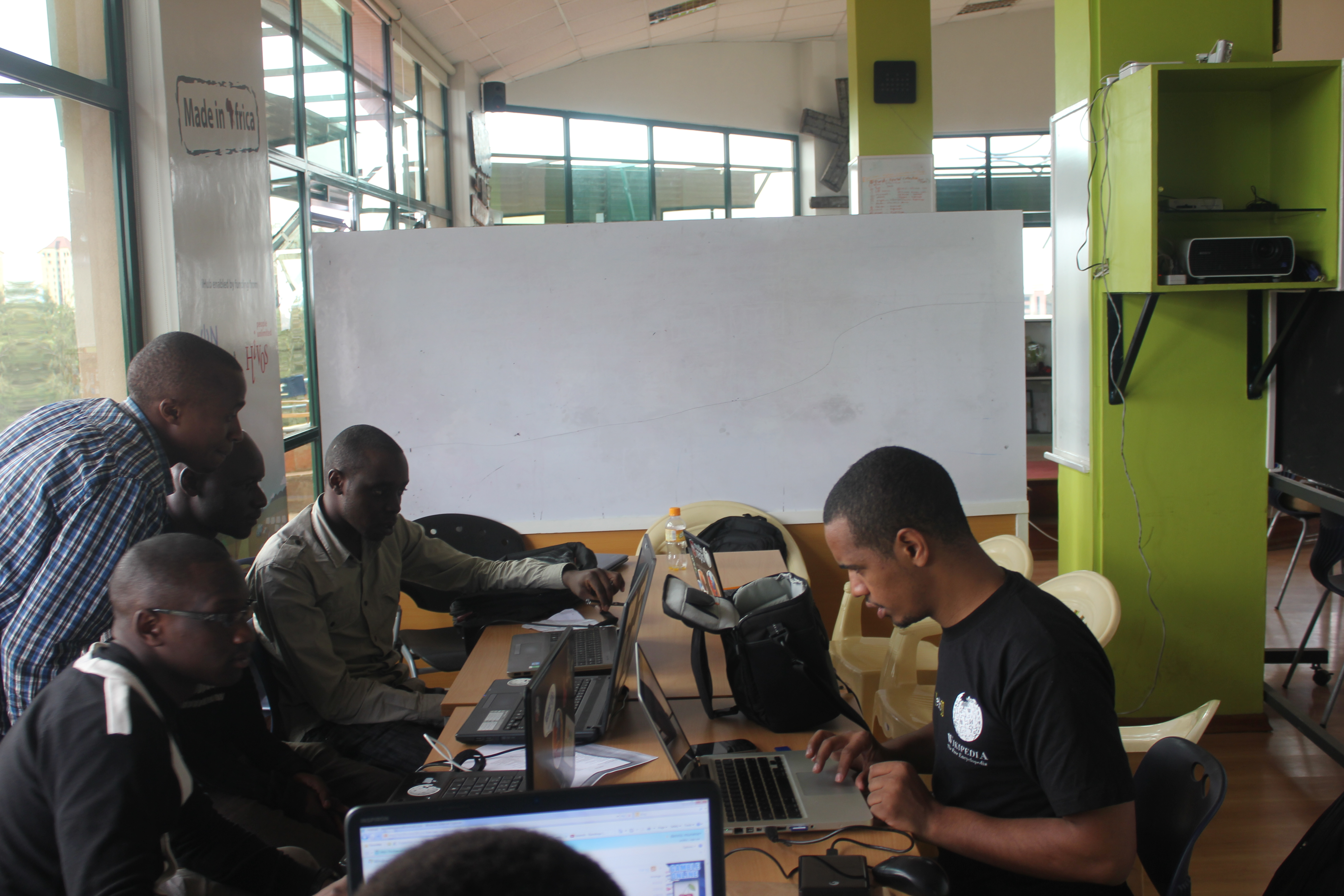
A meet-up at a Kenyan iHub.

Masyuko met Anne Shongwe, who had created Afroes, a business which had developed award-winning games for mobile telephones in Kenya and South Africa. They were joined by Kirinya and Chief Nyamweya in developing Haki: Shield & Defend, an Android game reaching 250,000 downloads and winning a World Youth Summit Award, which Masyuko collected in Montreal in 2012. Pamoji Mtaani, developed by Warner Bros., won the Global Business Coalition’s Business Excellence Award in 2011 and globally recorded over a million sales after big names in the Kenyan music industry, such as Jua Cali and Kevin Wyre, were involved in its production.

Though in 2007, there existed only a handful of retail stores predominantly selling video games, this number has gone up in recent years. In 2009, Kenya laid the first of its underseas fiber optic internet cables, bringing broadband internet within reach for the population. The government has since invested more money in the development of digital infrastructure, making online gaming viable. In 2010, iHub was created, a physical area for Kenyan ICT entrepreneurs to come together. Various other businesses followed suit, supporting start-up companies "through a mix of entrepreneurship training, research, funding, working spaces and mentoring." According to Masyuko, these developments are "shifting Kenya at a very unprecedented pace."

In June 2015, Kenyan company Black Division Games released Nairobi X, the first 3D video game developed in Africa. The game, a first-person shooter, achieved a large amount of international coverage due to its high graphical quality, and was released for PC and Android devices.

In events, a young video game entertainment company called Gaming For Kenya otherwise known as G4k handled several major gaming events in the country as well as promoting the video game culture. Their well known LAN parties, known as the "1UP Elite" LAN party, have gained momentum and amplified the social gaming culture in Kenya uniting gamers together to play with each other and have fun.

== Current situation ==
The Kenyan government plans to harness the technological progress of the country as part of its Vision 2030 plan, transforming the country into a "globally competitive and prosperous nation." This plan also involves the construction of a "Silicon Savannah," which is described as "Africa's answer to Silicon Valley." Despite these plans, unemployment is common in Kenya, and a failed ICT project could leave a young person without a job to fall back on. The rise of game development is creating jobs in the region.

In 2017 an Indie game studio (VEGA GAMING INC by developer M.E. Marvega)was set up in the nation's capital, and went on to release 3 games by the end of 2020. One of which was exclusive for Android users.

Their main focus now lies in creating AAA games for the larger African market with open world games like GUERILLA_MAFIA and YASHI CULT (a horror game). Such developers plan on pushing the limits of Kenyan game development and possibly the scope of African games.

Foreign AAA video games sell for around US$100 in Kenya, making it impossible for the general public to purchase more than a handful of video games, though a rise in spending power has been noticed, with some young people buying high-end PCs valued US$17,000 and upward. An issue faced by ICT entrepreneurs is that gaming is not taken seriously by the general public, making it difficult to find financial support.

According to Masyuko, African game development is mainly focused on mobile gaming, as this medium has the deepest penetration and the widest market. It is also considered an easier entry point as far as financing is concerned. However, Masyuko explains, "[w]e don't have proper retail stores like the App Store ... if you want something you just go to this one-stop shop." Developers at University of Games state that console gaming is picking up in the country, though it is not as prevalent as the mobile market.

Many cybercafes in Nairobi have a specific zone for people to play video games. These zones have proven to be more lucrative than charging for web browsing. Kenya's video game industry was estimated to be worth US$44 million at the end of 2013.

In esports, there are roughly established bodies governing esports events with the likes of the high-quality event Pro Series Gaming(P.S.G)", the Tekken 254 Circuit", the Pan African Gaming Union(P.A.G.U) Championships, Rise To Greatness - RIIG League" and other minor tournaments such as the Kenya International Gaming Series dubbed as "K.IN.G.S" the Vivid Gold ePlay Tournaments, KAGE and many more. So far the Pro Series Gaming has been the most dominant eSports company in Kenya and over East and Central Africa hosting countries such as Kenya, Uganda, Rwanda, Zambia and Malawi. Tekken 254 usually has a regular league called the Tekken 254 Circuit that runs every month until a full seasonal circuit is over as pro gamers await for the next season. The PAGU Championships, sponsored by Gaming For Kenya and other various entities is held throughout Africa with several countries that have membership to PAGU (currently playRX Africa) such as Kenya, Senegal, Ghana, Zambia and other member countries. RIIG League is done occasionally is sponsored by the Holos Gaming Matrix(HGM) on the Xbox franchise.

A new culture has also been adopted whereby some gamers in Kenya have started their own YouTube and Twitch channels. Regionally, they are the most known gaming YouTubers, using this platform to connect with their audience and build a following. Gaming in Kenya keeps growing as the years go by. Rental video games companies and business are seen emerging and opportunity like these encourage gamers to keep on playing. Companies such as Happy Wishy, Jumia and Pick and drop occasionally hold short PlayStation and Xbox tournaments in Kenya.

== Local philosophies ==
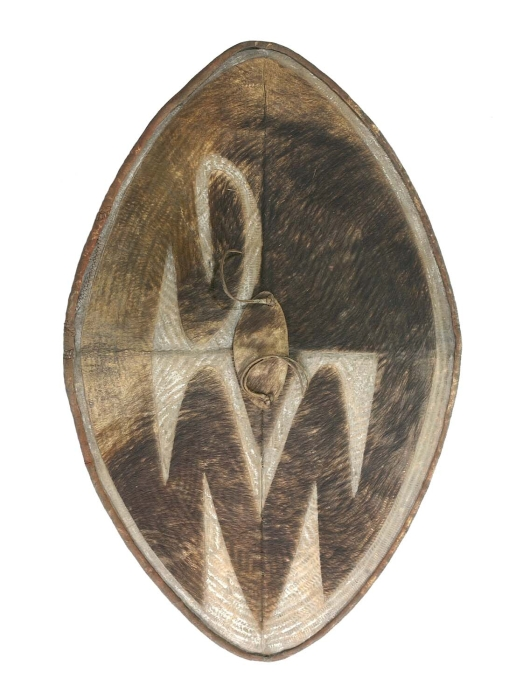
An East-African shield.

According to Brian Kinyua from four-man team University of Games, games offer an environment in which players can tackle social problem by themselves, without a "mob to back you up [or] peers to cheer you on." Kinyua believes that the idea of solving societal issues with gaming should be taken more serious. University of Games released Election Thief in 2013 which promotes peace through a fictional story of attempted electoral fraud, inspired by the 2007 Kenyan election. Haki: Shield and Defend as well as its sequel Haki: Chaguo Ni Lako, similarly attempt to promote social messages such as saving trees from illegal logging and practicing peace and tolerance during Kenyan elections.

Leti Arts commonly does contract development for serious games, usually for companies that are interested in educating their employees or creating learning tools. Nairobi-based studio Momentum Core has specialized in developing games for educational purposes, such as games raising awareness for HIV and education games for children.

Kenyan developers are mostly interested in making what they call "African games." According to Kirinya, what is important is that Kenyan games should tap into African cultural heritage, such as using traditional African weaponry rather than guns or medieval armor. There are also various thematic styles associated with Africa.

The colors, the ambiance, a lot of what people call earth colors — yellows, browns ... And then there's the sound part of it. There's a lot of percussion; the beat is a bit different. There's all these African sort of instruments. ... If it's an Age of Empires of Africa, you would not see an army with a full suit of armor — a full-cast armor.

— Wesley Kirinya
