= Video game industry =

Economic sector of video games

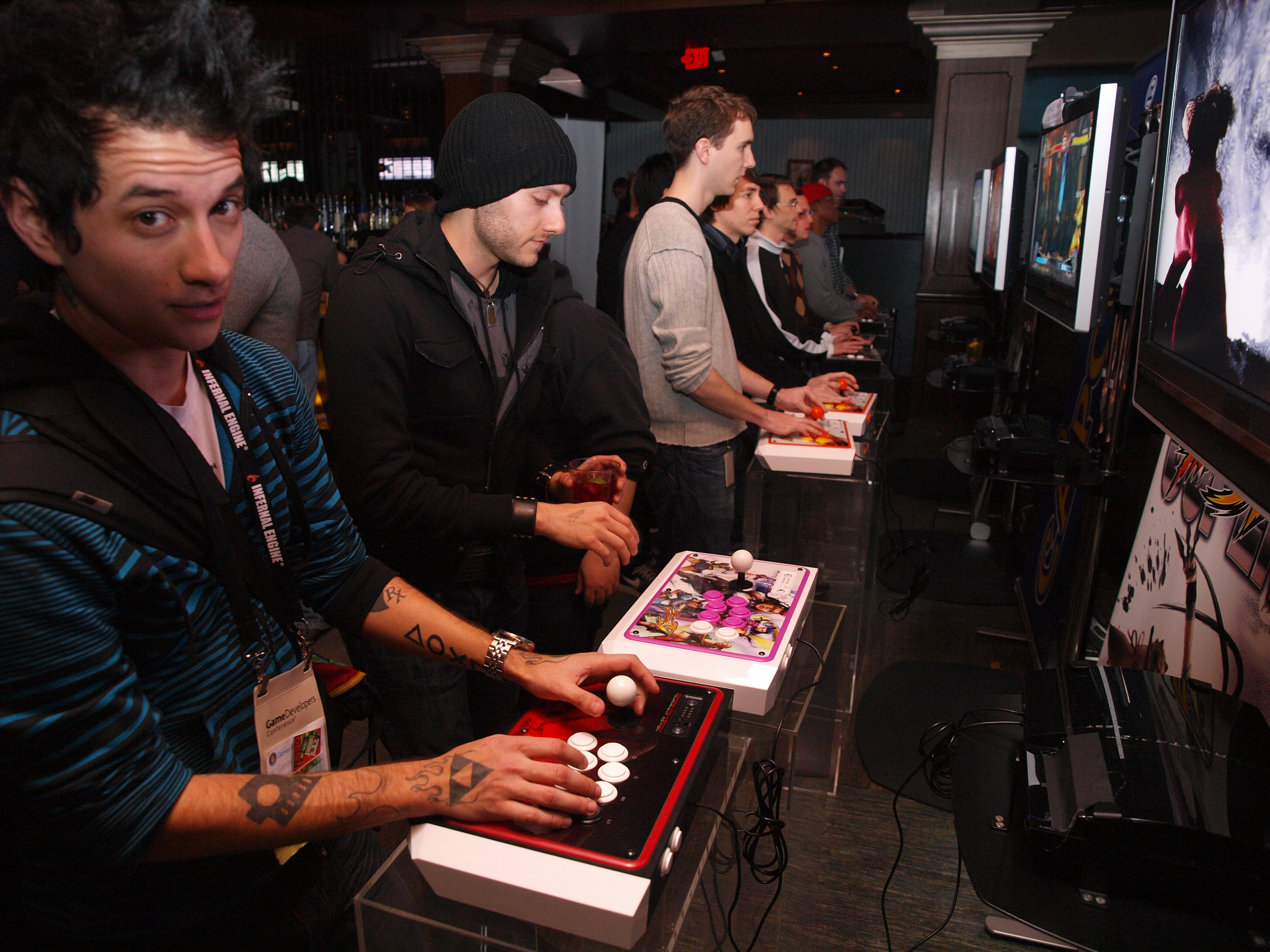
A video game developers' conference offers industry experts the chance to try new games and network.

The video game industry is a significant segment of the leisure sector, straddling the tertiary sector, which provides services to people, and the quaternary sector, which focuses on knowledge-intensive activities such as research and technological development. This industry includes the development, marketing, distribution, monetization, and consumer feedback processes related to video games. The industry encompasses dozens of job disciplines and thousands of jobs worldwide. The professions involved include game designers, software engineers, sound designers, testers, marketers, and customer support staff. Video games have gradually gained increasing relevance as a widespread cultural phenomenon, exerting significant influence on many areas of contemporary society. These influences extend to the economy and the labor market, education, consumption patterns and daily habits, architecture and urban planning, and sectors such as healthcare, the automotive industry, cinema and television, fashion, and sports.

The video game industry has grown from niche to mainstream. As of July 2018, video games generated US$134.9 billion annually in global sales. In the US, the industry earned about $9.5 billion in 2007, $11.7 billion in 2008, and US$25.1 billion in 2010, as per the ESA annual report. Research from Ampere Analysis indicated three points: the sector has consistently grown since at least 2015 and expanded 26% from 2019 to 2021, to a record $191 billion; the global games and services market is forecast to shrink 1.2% annually to $188 billion in 2022. Video games now compete with movies, music, and television in terms of both popularity and revenue.

The video game industry has played an important role in improvement of computer hardware. Many parts of modern personal computers were originally improved to meet the needs of video games. The industry has influenced the technological advancement of personal computers through sound cards, graphics cards and 3D graphic accelerators, CPUs, and co-processors like PhysX. Sound cards, for example, were originally developed for games and then improved for adoption by the music industry.

== Industry overview ==
=== Size ===
In 2017 in the United States, which represented about a third of the global video game market at the time, the Entertainment Software Association estimated that there were over 2,300 development companies and over 525 publishing companies, including in hardware and software manufacturing, service providers, and distributors. These companies in total have nearly 66,000 direct employees. If including indirect employment, such as a developer using the services of a graphics design package from a different firm, the total number of employees involved in the video game industry rises above 220,000.

=== Value chain ===
Traditionally, the video game industry has had six connected layers in its value chain based on the retail distribution of games:

1. Game development, representing programmers, designers, and artists, and their leadership, with support of middleware and other development tools.
2. Publishing, which typically includes both the source of funding the development of a video game, as well as providing the marketing and advertising for a game.
3. Distribution, whether through retail or digital channels. Distribution typically includes manufacturing and duplication of game media and packaging for retail games.
4. Retailer, storefront where the game is sold.
5. Consumers, the purchasers and players of video games
6. Hardware platform manufacturers, which can own and place limitations for content on the platform they have made, charging license fees to developers or publishers.

As games have transitioned from the retail to more digital market, parts of this value chain have become redundant. For example, the distributor may be redundant as a function of either the publisher or the retailer, or even in some cases as the case of indie games, the function of the developer themselves. Leani S

=== Roles ===
Ben Sawyer of Digitalmill observes that the development side of the industry is made up of six connected and distinctive layers:

1. Capital and publishing layer: involved in paying for development of new games and seeking returns through licensing of the properties.
2. Product and talent layer: includes developers, designers and artists, who may be working under individual contracts or as part of in-house development teams.
3. Production and tools layer: generates content production tools, game development middleware, customizable game engines, and production management tools.
4. Distribution layer: or the "publishing" industry, involved in generating and marketing catalogs of games for retail and online distribution.
5. Hardware (or Virtual Machine or Software Platform) layer: or the providers of the underlying platform, which may be console-based, accessed through online media, or accessed through mobile devices such as smartphones. This layer includes network infrastructure and non-hardware platforms such as virtual machines (such as Java or Flash), or software platforms such as browsers or Facebook.
6. End-users layer: or the players of the games.

The game industry employs those experienced in other traditional businesses, but some have experience tailored to the game industry. Some of the disciplines specific to the game industry include: game programmer, game designer, level designer, game producer, game artist, and game tester. Most of these professionals are employed by video game developers or video game publishers. However, many hobbyists also produce computer games and sell them commercially. Game developers and publishers sometimes employ those with extensive or long-term experience within the modding communities.

== History ==
=== 1940s–1960s ===
Prior to the 1970s, there was no significant commercial aspect of the video game industry, but many advances in computing would set the stage for the birth of the industry. Many early publicly available interactive computer-based game machines used or other mechanisms to mimic a display; while technically not "video games", they had elements of interactivity between the player and the machine. Some examples of these included the 1940 "Nimatron", an electromagnetic relay-based Nim-playing device designed by Edward Condon and built by Westinghouse Electric for the New York World's Fair, Bertie the Brain, an arcade game of tic-tac-toe, built by Josef Kates for the 1950 Canadian National Exhibition, and Nimrod created by engineering firm Ferranti for the 1951 Festival of Britain.

The development of cathode-ray tube, the core technology inside televisions, created several of the first true video games. In 1947, Thomas T. Goldsmith Jr. and Estle Ray Mann filed a patent for a "cathode ray tube amusement device". Their game, which uses a cathode-ray tube hooked to an oscilloscope display, challenges players to fire a gun at target.

Between the 1950s and 1960s, with mainframe computers becoming available to campus colleges, students and others started to develop games that could be played at terminals that accessed the mainframe. One of the first known examples is Spacewar!, developed by Harvard and MIT employees Martin Graetz, Steve Russell, and Wayne Wiitanen. The introduction of easy-to-program languages like BASIC for mainframes allowed for more simplistic games to be developed.

The arcade video game industry grew out of the pre-existing arcade game industry, which was previously dominated by electro-mechanical games (EM games). Following the arrival of Sega's EM game Periscope (1966), the arcade industry was experiencing a "technological renaissance" driven by "audio-visual" EM novelty games, establishing the arcades as a healthy environment for the introduction of commercial video games in the early 1970s. In the late 1960s, a college student named Nolan Bushnell had a part-time job at an arcade where he became familiar with EM games such as Chicago Coin's racing game Speedway (1969), watching customers play and helping to maintain the machinery, while learning how it worked and developing his understanding of how the game business operates.

=== 1970s ===
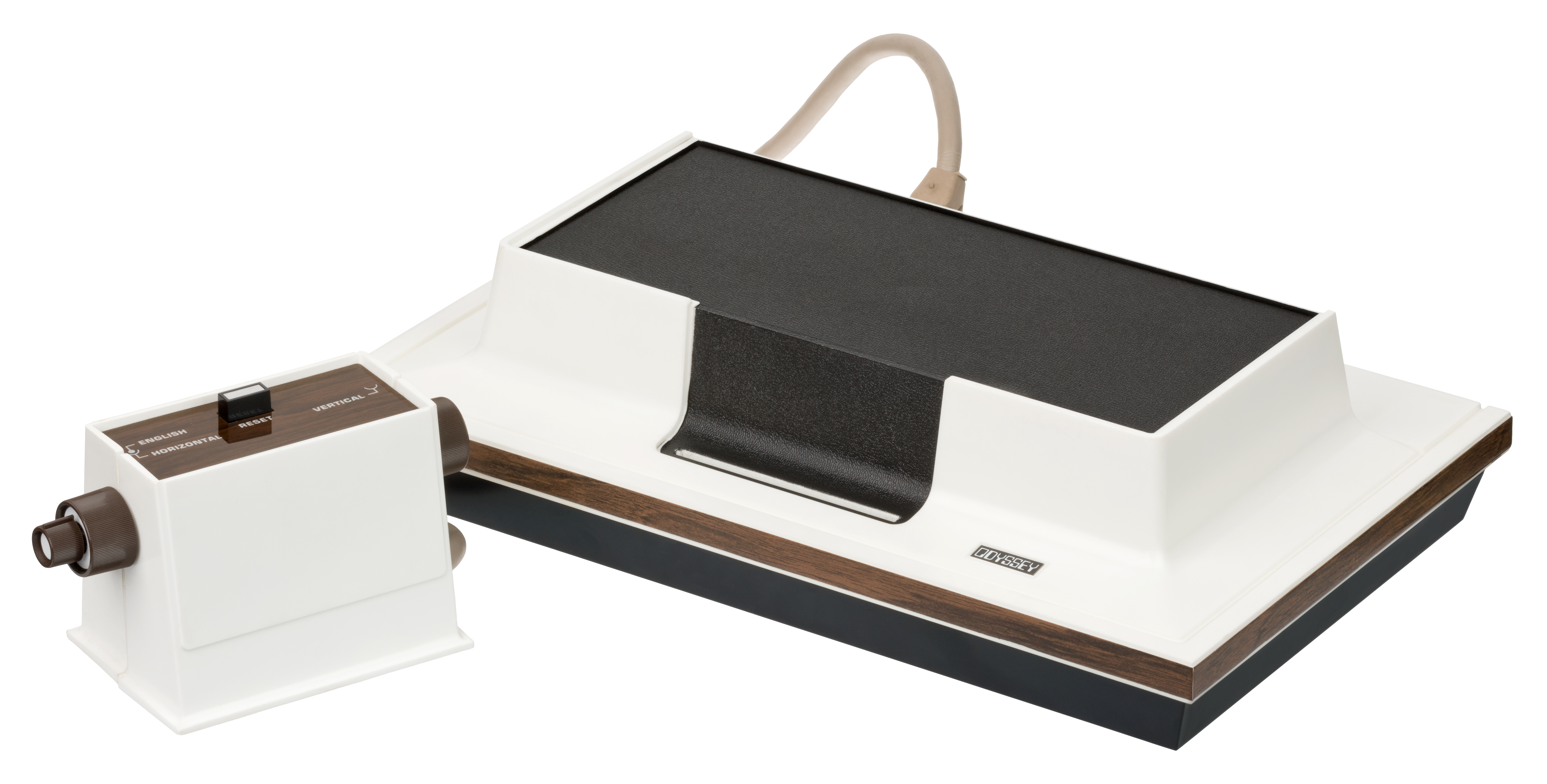
The Magnavox Odyssey was released in 1972 as the first home video game console.

In 1971, the first commercial arcade video game, Computer Space, was released. The following year, Atari, Inc. released the first commercially successful video game, Pong, and 19,000 arcade cabinets of the original arcade version were sold. In that year, video games were introduced to the home market with the release of the early video game console, the Magnavox Odyssey. However, both the arcade and home markets would be dominated by Pong clones, which flooded the market and led to the video game crash of 1977. The crash eventually came to an end with the success of Taito's Space Invaders, released in 1978, inspiring the golden age of video arcade games. The game's success prompted the prevalence of arcade machines in mainstream locations such as shopping malls, traditional storefronts, restaurants, and convenience stores during the golden age. More than 360,000 Space Invaders arcade cabinets were sold worldwide, and by 1982, generated a revenue of $2 billion (equivalent to $6.67 billion in 2025) in quarters.

Space Invaders was soon licensed for the Atari VCS (later known as Atari 2600), becoming the first "killer app" and quadrupling the console's sales. The success of the Atari 2600 in turn revived the home video game market during the second generation of consoles, until the video game crash of 1983. By the end of the 1970s, the personal computer game industry began forming from a hobby culture.

=== 1980s ===
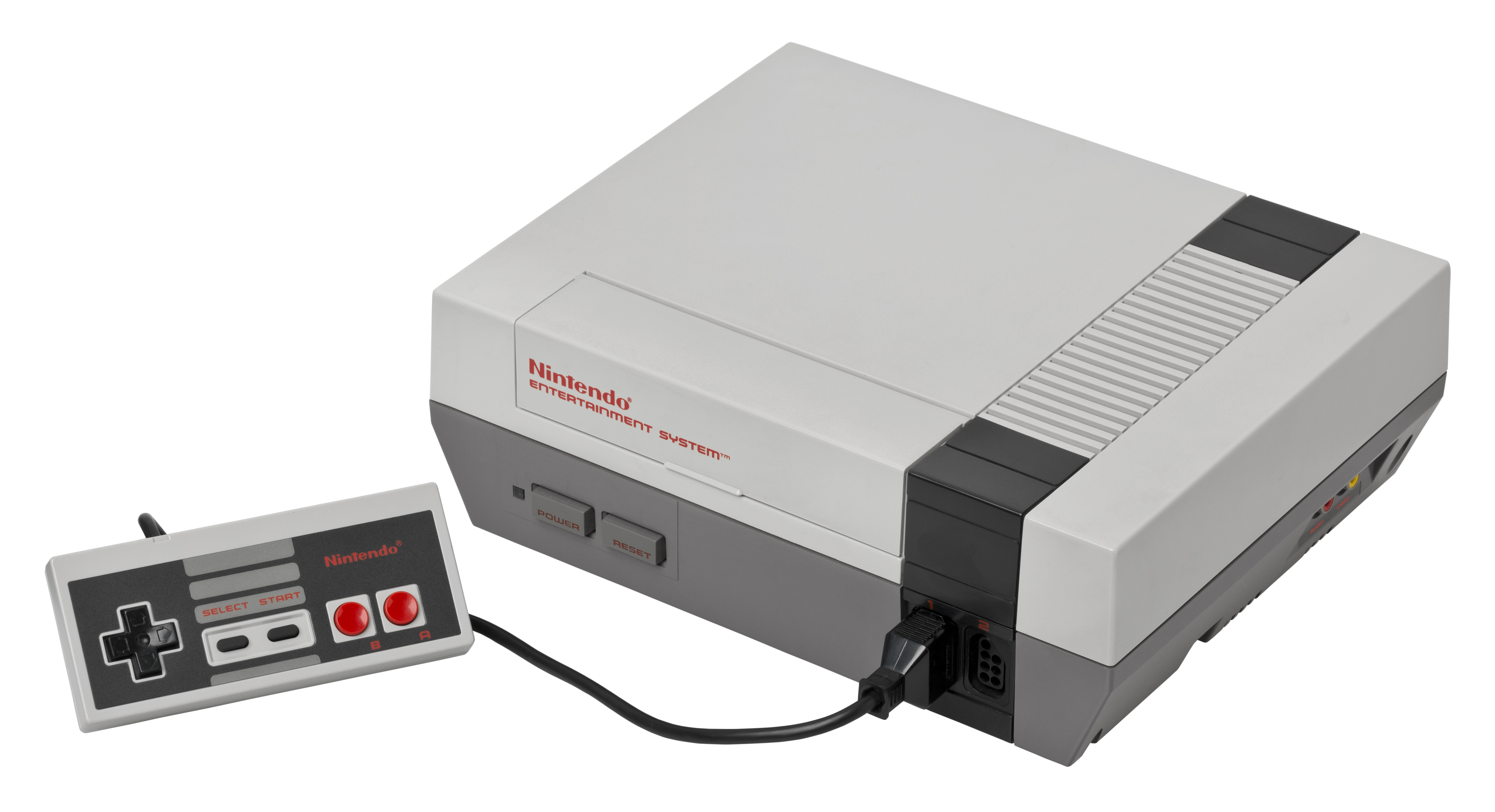
The Nintendo Entertainment System, released in 1985, revived the American video game industry after the video game crash of 1983.

In the early 1980s, the golden age of video arcade games reached its zenith. The total sales of arcade video game machines in North America increased significantly during this period, from $50 million in 1978 to $900 million by 1981, with the arcade video game industry's revenue in North America tripling to $2.8 billion in 1980. By 1981, the arcade video game industry was generating an annual North American revenue of $5 billion (equivalent to $17.7 billion in 2025). In 1982, the coin-operated video game industry reached its peak, generating $8 billion in quarters, surpassing the annual gross revenue of both pop music ($4 billion) and Hollywood films ($3 billion) combined. This was also nearly twice as much as the $3.8 billion generated by the home video game industry that year; both the arcade and home video game markets combined in 1982 total of $11.8 billion (equivalent to $39.4 billion in 2025). The arcade video game industry would continue to generate an annual revenue of $5 billion in quarters through to 1985. The most successful game of this era was Namco's Pac-Man, released in 1980, of which more than 350,000 cabinets were eventually sold, and within a year, collected more than $1 billion in quarters; in total, Pac-Man is estimated to have grossed over 10 billion quarters ($2.5 billion) during the 20th century.

In the early 1980s, 8-bit home computing and home-made games boomed. This was especially in Europe (with the ZX Spectrum and Commodore 64) and in Asia (with the NEC PC-88 and MSX). Video game journalism arose at that time, which was later expanded to include covermounted cassettes and CDs. In 1983, the North American industry crashed due to the production of too many badly developed games (quantity over quality), resulting in the fall of the North American industry. The industry would eventually be revitalized by the release of the Nintendo Entertainment System, which resulted in the home console market being dominated by Japanese companies such as Nintendo, while a professional European video game industry also began taking shape with companies such as Ocean Software and Gremlin Interactive. In 1987, Nintendo lost a legal challenge against Blockbuster Entertainment, which continued game rentals in the same way as movies. In 1989, the Game Boy handheld system was launched.

Video games transitioned from having been showcased at general trade shows like Consumer Electronics Show, to dedicated shows like Nintendo Space World and Electronic Entertainment Expo.

=== 1990s ===
The PlayStation was the most popular video game console of the fifth generation, with the mass adoption of CD media.

Game related technology advances of the 1990s include these:

- The "3D Revolution" where 3D polygon graphics became the de facto standard for video game visual presentation, initially in the arcades during the early 1990s, and then on home systems with 3D consoles and PC graphics cards in the mid-1990s.
- The widespread adoption of CD-based storage and software distribution
- Continuing advancement of CPU speed and sophistication
- Widespread adoption of GUI-based operating systems, such as the series of Amiga OS, Microsoft Windows and Mac OS
- Shrinking of hardware, with handheld game consoles and mobile phones, which enabled mobile gaming
- The emergence of the Internet, which in the late 1990s enabled online cooperative play and competitive gaming

Aside from technology, in the early part of the decade, licensed games became more popular, as did video game sequels.

The arcades experienced a renaissance in the early 1990s following the release of Street Fighter II (1991), which led to a number of other popular fighting games such as Fatal Fury (1991) and Mortal Kombat (1992). The arcade resurgence was further driven by increasing realism, with the "3D Revolution" from 2D and pseudo-3D graphics to true real-time 3D polygon graphics, following the release of games such as Virtua Racing (1992) and Virtua Fighter (1993). In the late 1990s, there was a transition away from arcades to home systems. Until about 1996–1997, arcade video games represented the largest sector of the global video game industry, before arcades declined and the console market surpassed arcade video games for the first time around 1997–1998. Arcade systems such as the Sega Model 3 remained more technologically advanced than home systems in the late 1990s, but the gap between arcade and home systems began narrowing in the late 1990s.

The video game industry generated worldwide sales of $19.8 billion in 1993 (equivalent to $44.1 billion in 2025), $20.8 billion in 1994 (equivalent to $45.2 billion in 2025), and an estimated $30 billion in 1998 (equivalent to $59.3 billion in 2025). In the United States alone, in 1994, arcades generated $7 billion in quarters while home console game sales generated $6 billion Combined, this was nearly two and a half times the $5 billion revenue generated by movies in the United States at the time.

=== 2000s ===
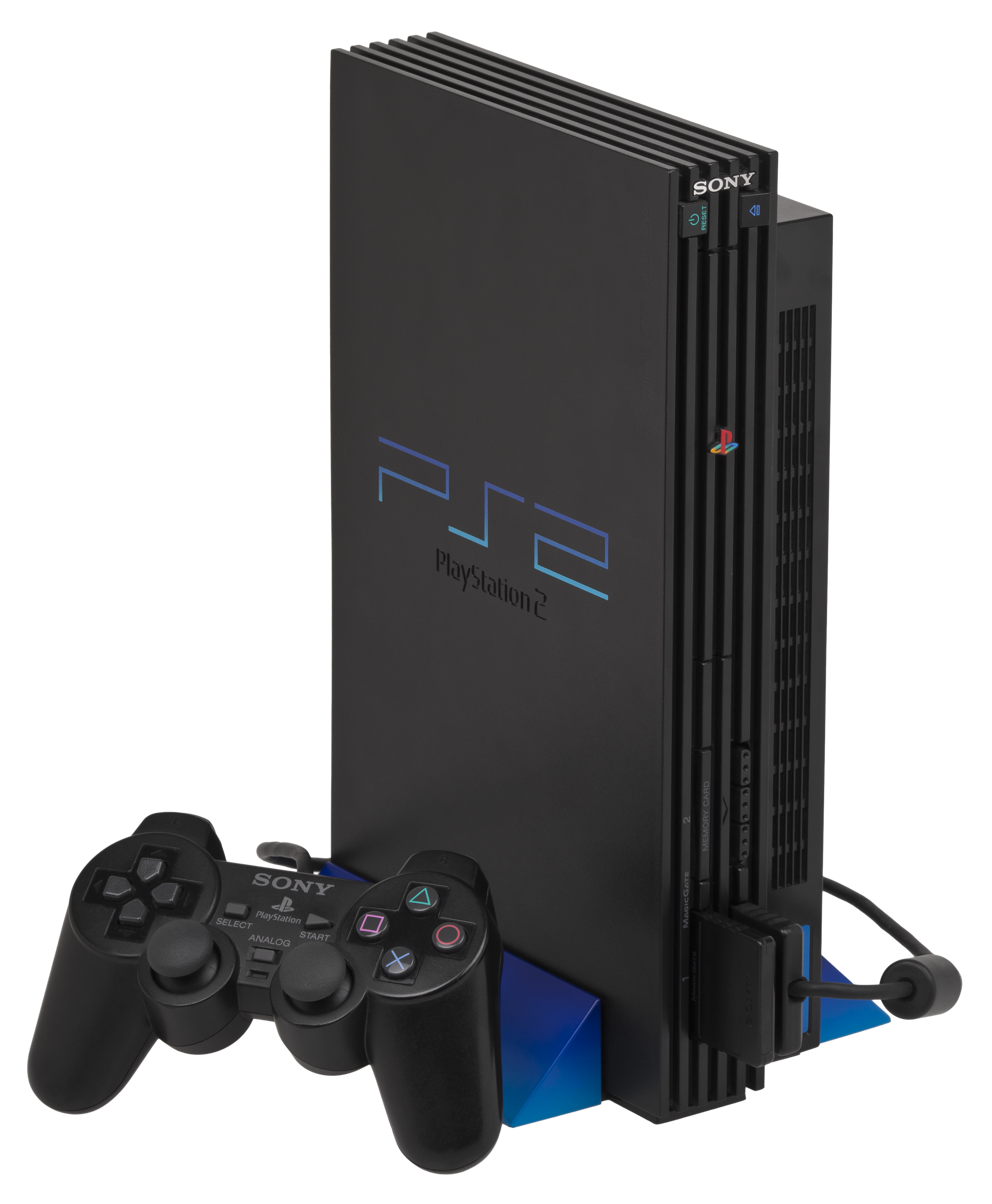
The sixth-generation PlayStation 2 is the best-selling console of all time.

In the 2000s, the video game industry was in heavy development; profit still drove technological advancement used by other industry sectors. Technologies such as Smartphones, virtual reality, and augmented reality were major drivers for game hardware and gameplay development. Though maturing, the video game industry was still very volatile, with third-party video game developers quickly cropping up, and just as quickly, going out of business. Nevertheless, many casual games and indie games became successful, such as Braid and Limbo. Game development for mobile phones (such as iOS and Android devices) and social networking sites emerged. For example, a Facebook game developer, Zynga, raised more than $300 million.

=== 2010s ===
Indie games are not the main driver but significantly impact the industry, such as Spelunky, Fez, Don't Starve, Castle Crashers, and Minecraft, with millions of dollars and users. In the 2010s, the shift increased to casual and mobile gaming, and in 2016, the mobile video game market was estimated at $38 billion in revenues, compared to $6 billion for the console market and $33 billion for personal computing gaming. Virtual reality and augmented reality games arose during this decade. As of 2014, newer game companies arose that vertically integrate live operations and publishing such as crowdfunding and other direct-to-consumer efforts, rather than relying on a traditional publishers, and some of these grew substantially. Spurred by some initial events in the late 2000s, eSports centered around professional players in organized competitions and leagues for prize money, grew greatly over this decade, drawing hundreds of millions of viewers and reaching nearly $500 million in revenue by 2016 and expected to break $1 billion by 2019.

=== 2020s ===
The next generations of Xbox Series X/S and PlayStation 5 were planned for 2020, but the video game industry was affected by the COVID-19 pandemic that had a worldwide impact starting in March 2020 due to forced stay-at-home orders by governmental regulations. There were similar impacts to the video game industry as with other industries, such as cancellation of in-person trade shows, conventions and esports events, and the delay of many games into late 2020, 2021, or beyond, and the industry was one of the few to actually thrive from a home-bound population using video games to cope. The market had a 20% year-to-year growth from 2019, reaching over $179 billion in global revenue in both hardware and software for 2020. Easily learned games with high social interactions were popular, including Animal Crossing: New Horizons, Fall Guys, and Among Us.

As the pandemic wore on from 2020 into 2021, a secondary effect was the impact of the global semiconductor chip shortage on hardware manufacturing. The three major console vendors, Nintendo, Microsoft, and Sony, were impacted by availability of supply of core components, and for the latter two, limited the launch of their new consoles. The chip supply shortage also affected personal computer gamers, coupled with demand for computer parts to be used in cryptocurrency mining, which artificially raised prices and made it difficult to purchase newer components. However, after cryptocurrency mining started paying out less during and following the 2021–2022 cryptocurrency crash, computer parts such as GPUs have become more affordable as of August 2022.

== Economics ==
View source data.
Global revenue estimates of the video game industry from 1971 to 2018, not adjusted for inflation, according to market research firm Pelham Smithers.
The chart shows the impacts of the 1977 crash, the golden age of arcade games (1978–1983), the video game crash of 1983, the console revival (late 1980s), and the rise of mobile gaming since 2008.

Early development costs were minimal, and video games could be quite profitable. Games developed by a single programmer, or by a small team of programmers and artists, could sell hundreds of thousands of copies each. Many of these games only took a few months to create, so developers could release multiple games per year. Thus, publishers could often be generous with benefits, such as royalties on the games sold. Many early game publishers started from this economic climate, such as Origin Systems, Sierra Entertainment, Capcom, Activision and Electronic Arts.

As computing and graphics power increased, so too did the size of development teams, as larger staffs were needed to address the ever-increasing technical and design complexities. The larger teams consist of programmers, artists, game designers, and producers. Their salaries can range anywhere from $50,000 to $120,000 generating large labor costs for firms producing video games which can often take between one and three years to develop. Modern budgets typically reach millions of dollars and use middleware and pre-built game engines. In addition to growing development costs, marketing budgets have grown dramatically, sometimes two to three times of the cost of development.

Traditionally, the video game monetization method is to sell hard copies in retail store. Cheaper production and distribution methods include online distribution.

In the 2010s, the video game industry had a major impact on the economy through the sales of major systems and games such as Call of Duty: Black Ops, which had over $650 million of sales in the game's first five days and which set a five-day global record for a movie, book or video game. The game's income was more than the opening weekend of Spider-Man 3 and the previous title holder for a video game Halo 3. Many individuals have also benefited from the economic success of video games including the former chairman of Nintendo and Japan's third richest man: Hiroshi Yamauchi. By 2014, the global video game market was valued at over $93 billion.

The industry wide adoption of high-definition graphics during the seventh generation of consoles greatly increased development teams' sizes and reduced the number of high-budget, high-quality games under development. In 2013 Richard Hilleman of Electronic Arts estimated that only 25 developers were working on such games for the eighth console generation, compared to 125 at the same point in the seventh generation-console cycle seven or eight years earlier.

By 2018, the United States video game industry had matched that of the United States film industry on basis of revenue, with both having made around US$43 billion that year.

Since 2000, the video game industry was considered recession-proof, having thrived compared to other industries during the 2008 Great Recession, and as one of the more profitable industries during the COVID-19 pandemic in 2020 and 2021. Video games are seen as a low-cost vice and entertainment for consumers when approaching recession. However, in 2022, atop pandemic economic fallout including chip shortages, supply chain disruption, and consumers preferring outdoor activities, the industry started to indicate recession with global revenues falling for the first time in twenty years.

=== Retail ===
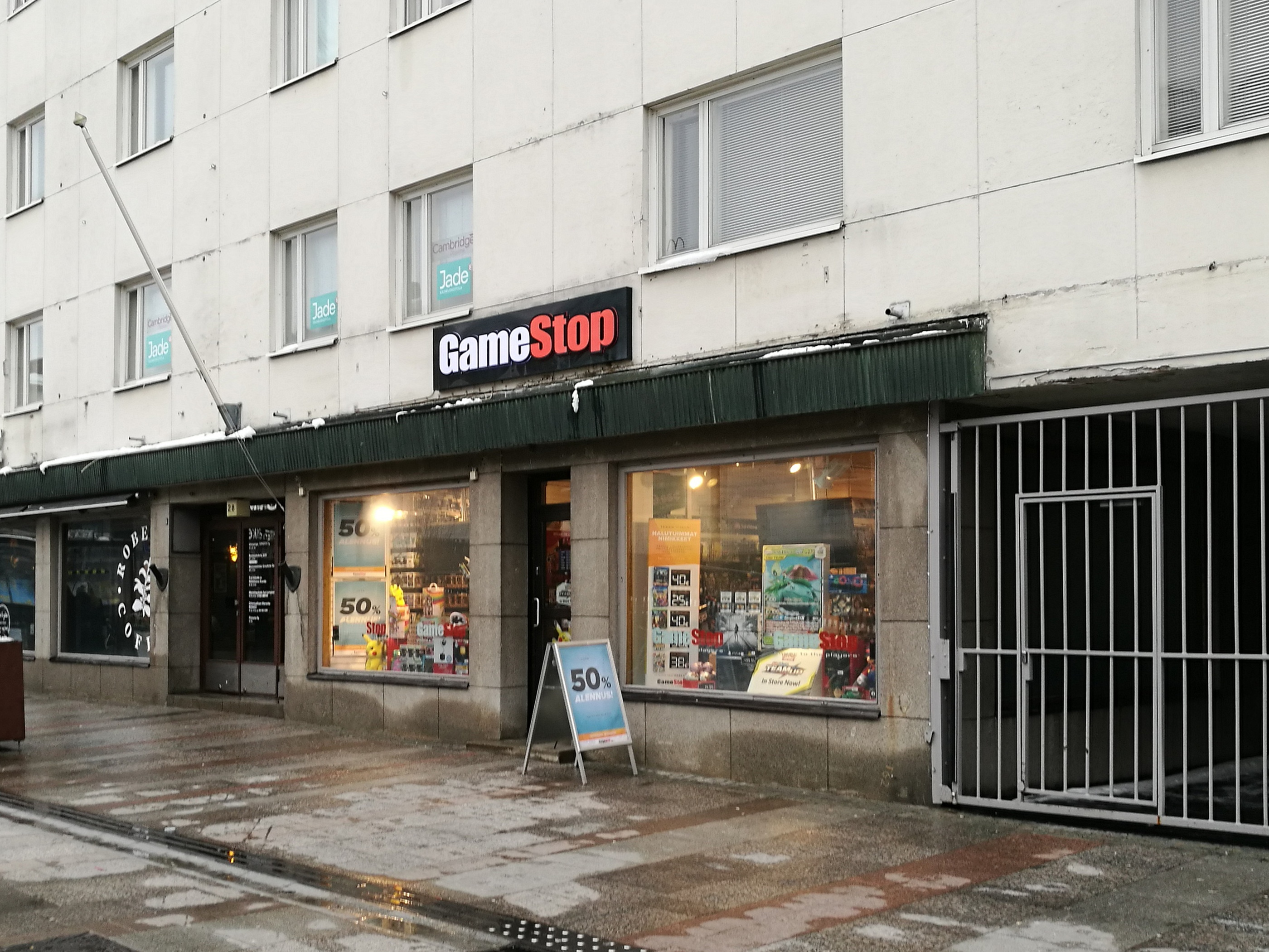
GameStop video game store at the Isokatu street in Oulu

The industry's shift from brick and mortar retail to digital downloads led to a severe sales decline at video game retailers such as GameStop, following other media retailers superseded by Internet delivery, such as Blockbuster, Tower Records, and Virgin Megastores. GameStop diversified its services by purchasing chains that repair wireless devices and expanding its trade-in program through which customers trade used games for credit towards new games. The company began to produce its own merchandise and games. In Britain, the games retailer Game revamped its stores so customers would spend time playing games there. It built a gaming arena for events and tournaments. The shift to digital marketplaces, especially for smartphones, led to an influx of inexpensive and disposable games, and lower engagement among gamers who otherwise purchased new games from retail. Customers also shifted away from the tradition of buying games on their first day of release.

Publishers often funded trade-in deals to encourage consumers to purchase new games. Trade-in customers at the Australian retailer Game would purchase twice the games per year as non-trade-in customers. The sale of pre-owned games kept retailers in business, and composed about a third of Game's revenue. Retailers also saved on the UK's value-added tax, which only taxed the retailer's profit on pre-owned games, rather than the full sale on regular games. The former trade-in retail executives behind the trade-in price comparison site Trade In Detectives estimated that the United Kingdom's trade-in industry was about a third of the size of its new games business. They figured that sites such as eBay, which convert used games into cash, compose about a quarter of the UK's trade-in market, but do not keep the credit within the industry. While consumers might appear to receive better offers on these sites, they also take about 15 percent of the selling price in fees. Alternatively, some retailers will match the trade-in values offered by their competitors. Microsoft's original plan for the Xbox One attempted to translate trade-in deals for the digital marketplace, with a database of product licenses that shops would be able to resell with publisher permission, though the plan was poorly received or poorly sold.

== Practices ==
Video game industry practices are similar to those of other entertainment industries (e.g., the music recording industry), but the video game industry in particular has been accused of treating its development talent poorly. This promotes independent development, as developers leave to form new companies and projects. In some notable cases, these new companies grow large and impersonal, having adopted the business practices of their forebears, and ultimately perpetuate the cycle.

However, unlike the music industry, where modern technology has allowed a fully professional product to be created extremely inexpensively by an independent musician, modern games require increasing amounts of manpower and equipment. This dynamic makes publishers, who fund the developers, much more important than in the music industry.

=== Breakaways ===
In the video game industry, it is common for developers to leave their current studio and start their own. A particularly famous case is the "original" independent developer Activision, founded by former Atari developers. Activision grew to become the world's second largest game publisher. In the meantime, many of the original developers left to work on other projects. For example, founder Alan Miller left Activision to start another video game development company, Accolade (now Atari née Infogrames).

Activision was popular among developers for giving them credit in the packaging and title screens for their games, while Atari disallowed this practice. As the video game industry took off in the mid-1980s, many developers faced the more distressing problem of working with fly-by-night or unscrupulous publishers that would either fold unexpectedly or run off with the game profits.

=== Piracy ===
The industry claims software piracy to be a big problem, and takes measures to counter this. Digital rights management have proved to be the most unpopular with gamers, as a measure to counter piracy. The most popular and effective strategy to counter piracy is to change the business model to freemium, where gamers pay for their in-game needs or service. Strong server-side security is required for this, to properly distinguish authentic transactions from hacked transactions.

=== Creative control ===
On various Internet forums, some gamers have expressed disapproval of publishers having creative control since publishers are more apt to follow short-term market trends rather than invest in risky but potentially lucrative ideas. On the other hand, publishers may know better than developers what consumers want. The relationship between video game developers and publishers parallels the relationship between recording artists and record labels in many ways. But unlike the music industry, which has seen flat or declining sales in the early 2000s, the video game industry continues to grow.

In the computer games industry, it is easier to create a startup, resulting in many successful companies. The console industry is more closed, and a game developer must have up to three licenses from the console manufacturer:

1. A license to develop games for the console
2. The publisher must have a license to publish games for the console
3. A separate license for each game

In addition, the developer must usually buy development systems from the console manufacturer in order to develop a game for consideration, as well as obtain concept approval for the game from the console manufacturer. Therefore, the developer normally has to have a publishing deal in place before starting development on a game project, but in order to secure a publishing deal, the developer must have a track record of console development, something which few startups will have.

=== Gaming conventions ===
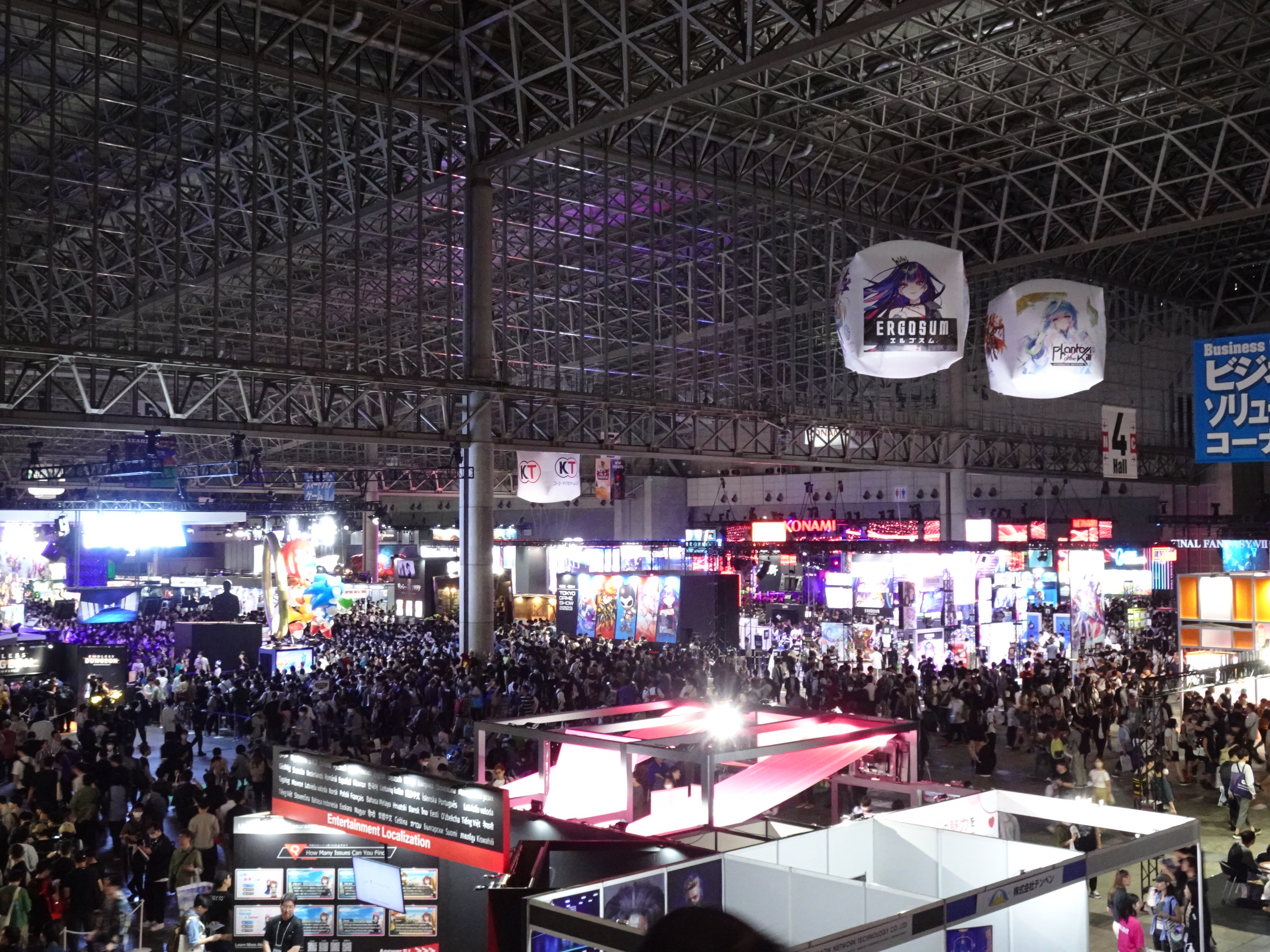
Tokyo Game Show, in Makuhari Messe, Chiba City, Chiba Prefecture, Japan in 2023

Gaming conventions are an important showcase of the industry. The major annual video game conventions include Gamescom in Cologne (Germany) Penny Arcade Expo, Summer Games Fest, Tokyo Game Show (TGS), Brazil Game Show (BGS), and prior to its cancellation, E3 in Los Angeles (US), etc.

=== Regional distribution ===
As with other forms of media, video games have often been released in different world regions at different times. The practice has been used where localization is not done in parallel with the rest of development or where the game must be encoded differently, as in PAL vs. NTSC. It has also been used to provide price discrimination in different markets or to focus limited marketing resources. Developers may also stagger digital releases so as not to overwhelm the servers hosting the game.

== International practices ==
The video game industry had its primary roots in the United States following the introduction of arcade games and console systems, with Japan soon following. With the introduction of the personal computer, Western Europe also became a major center for video game development. Since then, the industry is primarily led by companies in North America, Europe, and Japan, but other regions, including Australia/New Zealand, and other East Asian countries including China and South Korea, have become significant sectors for the industry.

=== World trends ===
International video game revenue was over $142B in 2022. This is almost double the revenue of the international film industry in 2023.

The gaming industry saw strong growth in 2020, the first year of the pandemic, and this trend continued into 2021.

=== Largest markets ===
According to market research firm Newzoo, the following countries are the largest video game markets by annual revenue, as of 2025:

Rank	Country	Revenue (billion US$)
1	China	53.2
2	United States	49.8
3	Japan	17.6
4	South Korea	7.8
5	Germany	7.0
6	United Kingdom	6.6
7	France	4.1
8	Canada	3.1
9	Brazil	2.7
10	Mexico	2.7

According to market research firm Newzoo, the following countries are the largest video game markets by number of players in the top 10 richest video game markets, as of 2025:

Rank	Country	Number of players (million)
1	China	723 million
2	United States	225 million
3	Brazil	123 million
4	Mexico	78 million
5	Japan	74 million
6	Germany	53 million
7	France	45 million
8	United Kingdom	43 million
9	South Korea	34 million
10	Canada	24 million

In general, spending on gaming tends to increase with increase in nominal GDP. However, gaming is relatively more popular in East Asia, and relatively less popular in India.

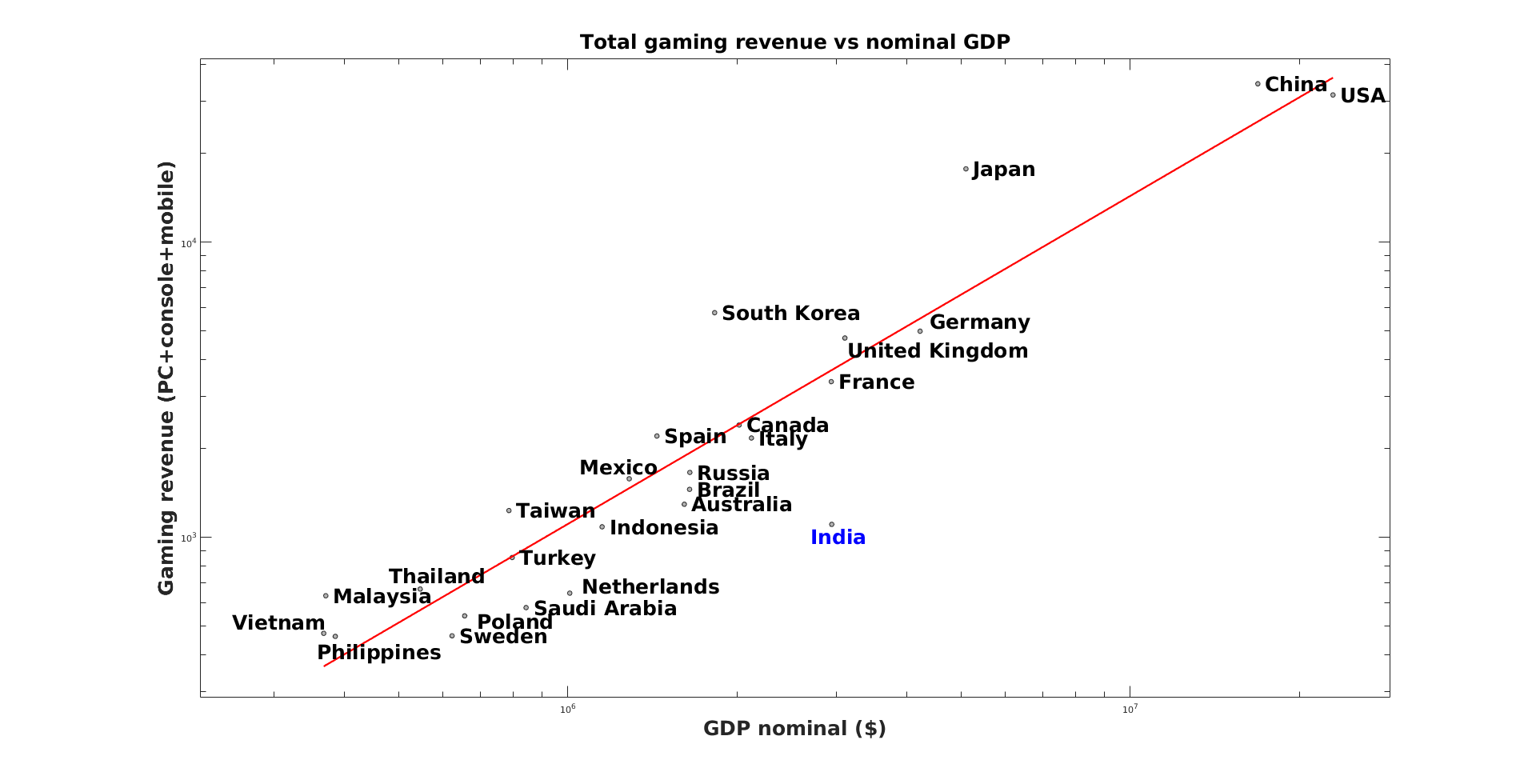
Total gaming revenue (mobile + PC + console) vs nominal GDP by country

=== North America ===
==== Canada ====
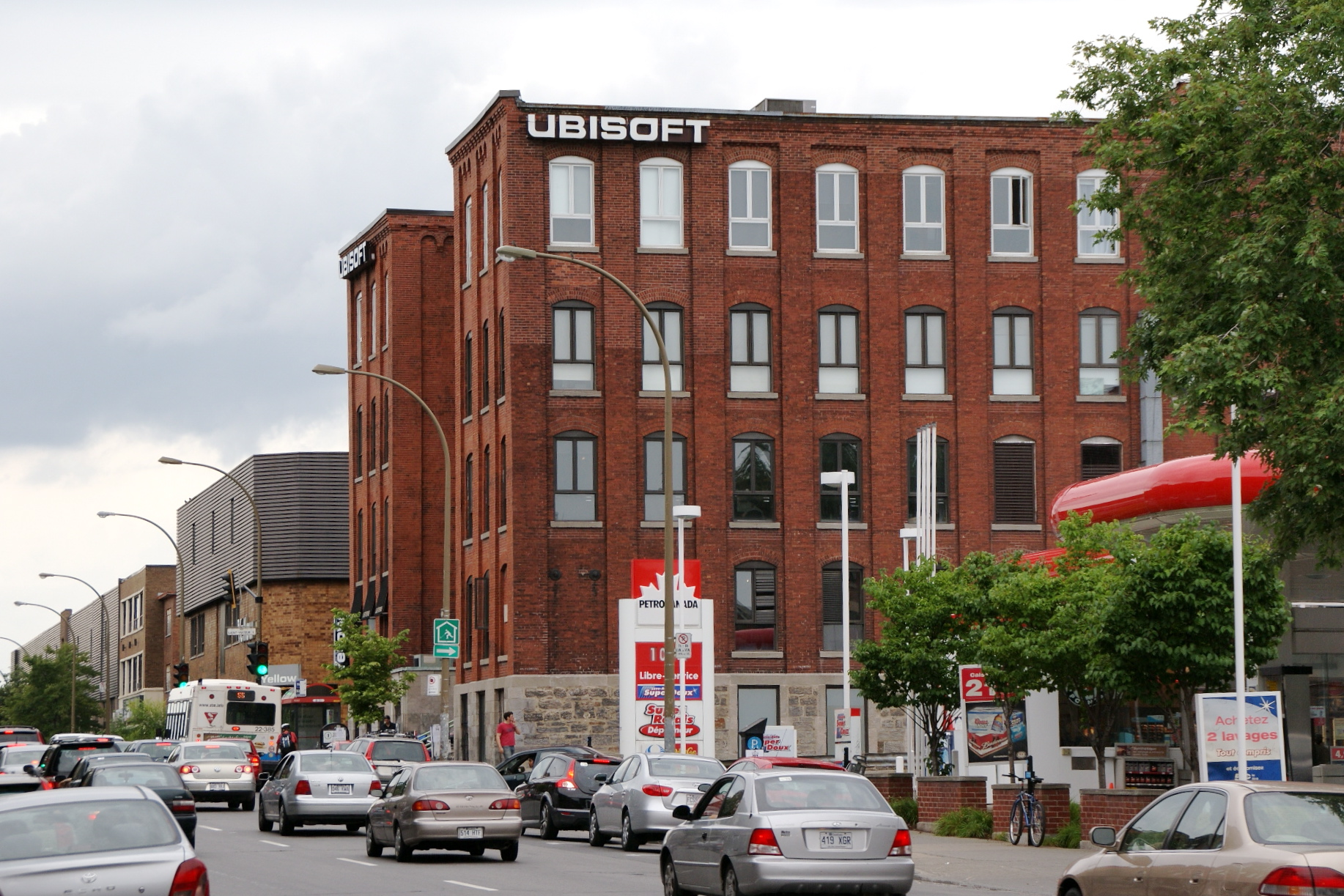
Ubisoft Montreal

Canada has the third largest video game industry in terms of employment numbers. The video game industry has also been booming in Montreal since 1997, coinciding with the opening of Ubisoft Montreal. Recently, the city has attracted world leading game developers and publishers studios such as Ubisoft, EA, Eidos Interactive, Artificial Mind and Movement, BioWare, Warner Bros. Interactive Entertainment, and Strategy First, mainly because video games jobs have been heavily subsidized by the provincial government. Every year, this industry generates billions of dollars and thousands of jobs in the Montreal area. Vancouver has also developed a particularly large cluster of video game developers, the largest of which, Electronic Arts, employs over two thousand people. The Assassin's Creed series, along with the Tom Clancy series have all been produced in Canada and have achieved worldwide success. For consumers, the largest video games convention in Canada is the Enthusiast Gaming Live Expo (EGLX).

==== United States ====
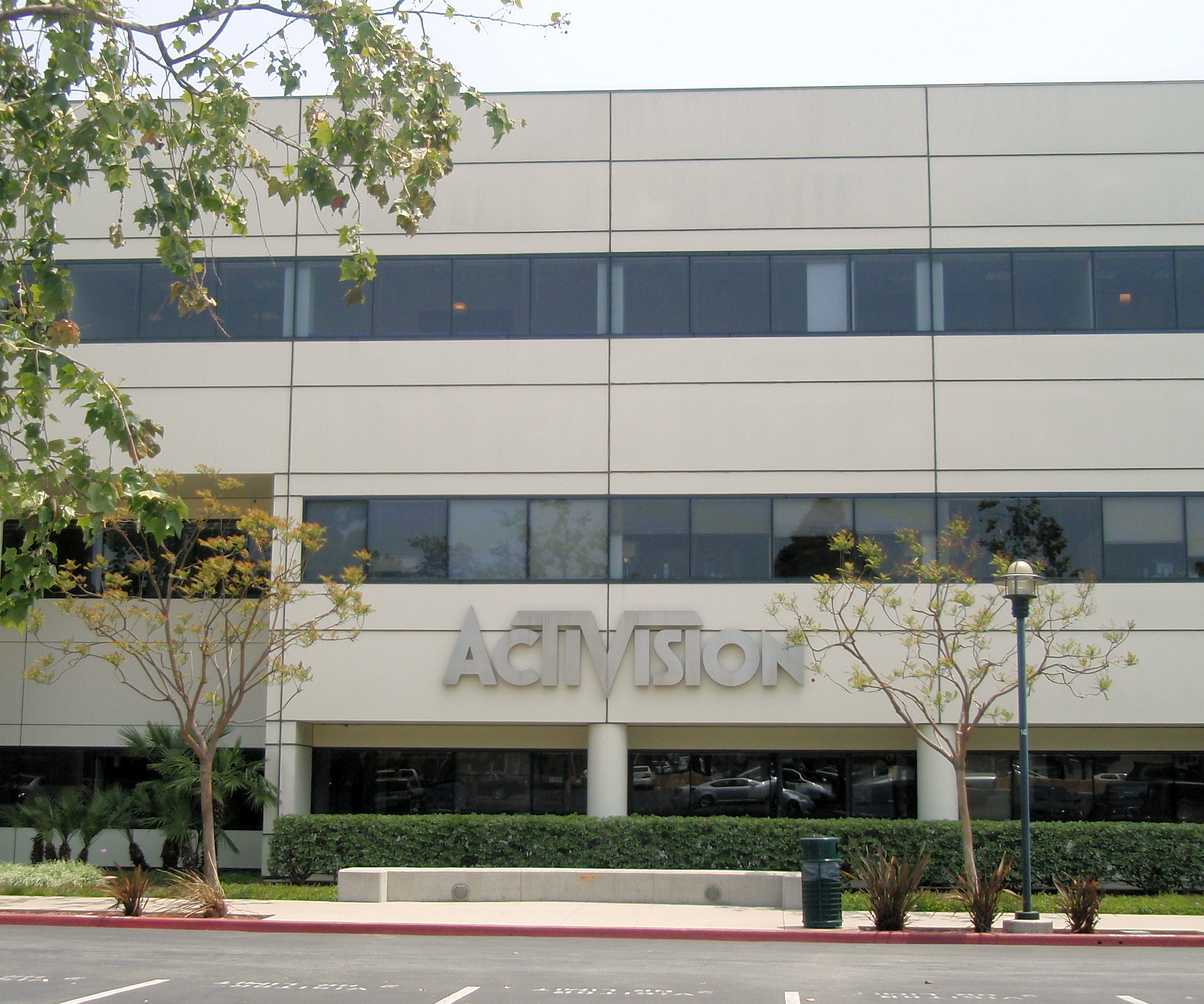
Activision (now Activision Blizzard) is the first independent or third-party video game developer.

The video game industry got its start in the United States in the 1970s and early 1980s with the creation of arcade games like Pong and the first home console, the Magnavox Odyssey. Several factors, including loss of publishing control, a flooded market, and competition from personal computers, led to the 1983 video game crash in the U.S., affecting both arcades and home game systems. Nintendo's introduction of the Nintendo Entertainment System helped to revitalize the industry, but until Microsoft's introduction of the Xbox in the early 2000s, the hardware side was dominated by mostly Japanese-developed systems. Instead, much of the industry's growth in the U.S. was on game development, implementing new game technologies and gameplay concepts, as well as creating the large-scale publisher model used by companies like Electronic Arts to support marketing and distribution of games.

The United States has the largest video games presence in the world in terms of total industry employees. In 2017, the U.S. game industry as a whole was worth US$18.4 billion and consisted of roughly 2457 companies that had a rough total of 220,000 people employed. U.S. video game revenue is forecast to reach $230 billion by 2022, making it the largest video game market in the world. Over 150 million Americans play video games, with an average age of 35 and a gender breakdown of 59 percent male and 41 percent female. American gamers are more likely to vote than non-gamers, feel that the economy is the most important political issue, and lean conservative, however party demographics are split evenly with 38% identifying as Democrats, 38% identifying as Republicans, and 24% identifying as Independents.

=== Europe ===
==== Germany ====
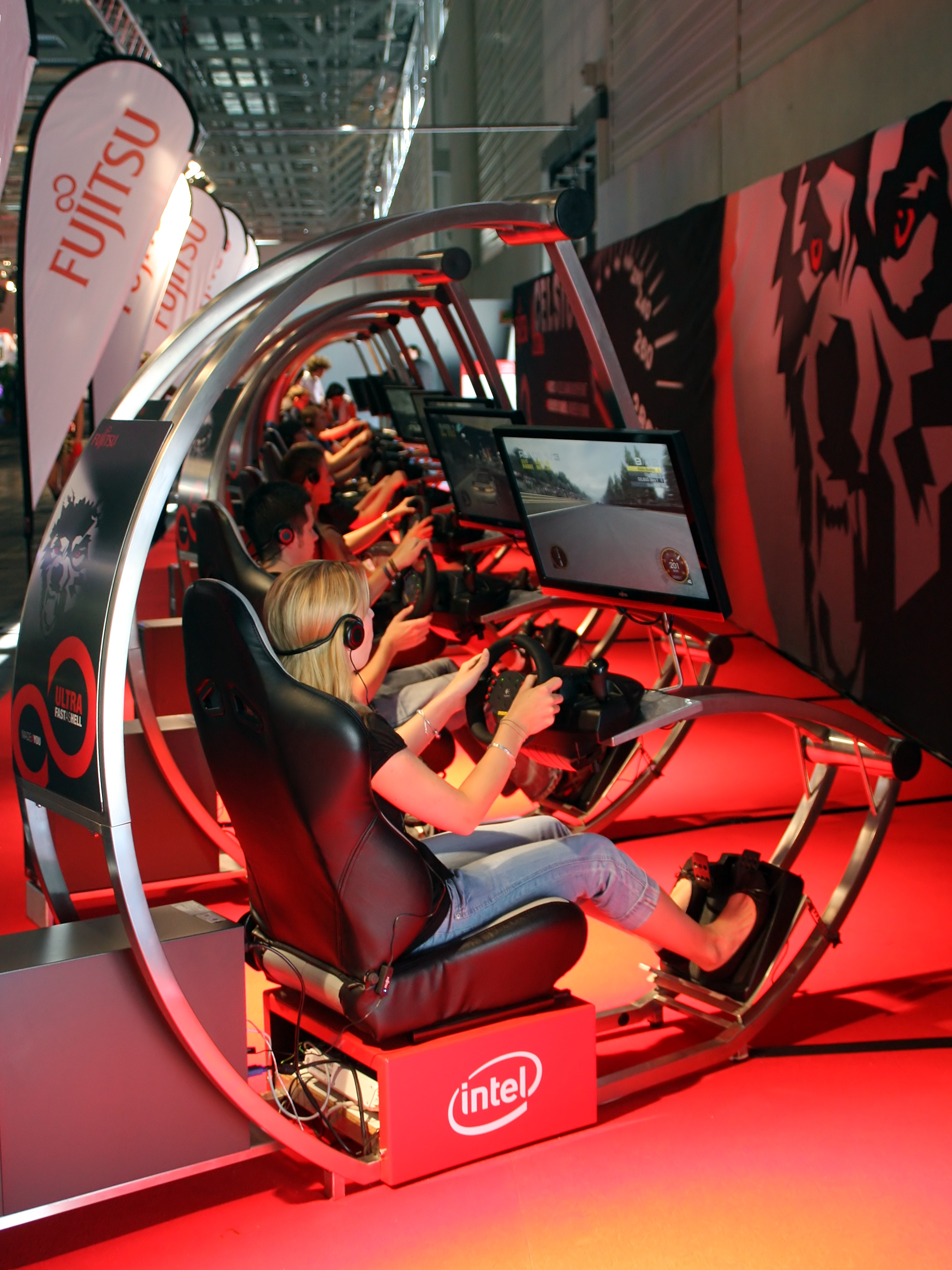
The Gamescom in Cologne is the world's leading game trade fair.

Germany has the largest video games market in Europe, with revenues of $4.1 billion forecast for 2017. The annual Gamescom in Cologne is Europe's largest video game expo.

One of the earliest internationally successful video game companies was Gütersloh-based Rainbow Arts (founded in 1984) who were responsible for publishing the popular Turrican series of games. The Anno series and The Settlers series are globally popular strategy game franchises since the 1990s. The Gothic series, SpellForce and Risen are established RPG franchises. The X series by Egosoft is the best-selling space simulation. The FIFA Manager series was also developed in Germany. The German action game Spec Ops: The Line (2012) was successful in the markets and received largely positive reviews. One of the most famed games from Germany is Far Cry (2004) by Frankfurt-based Crytek, who also produced the topseller Crysis and its sequels later.

Other well-known current and former developers from Germany include Ascaron, Blue Byte, Deck13, EA Phenomic, Piranha Bytes, Radon Labs, Related Designs, Spellbound Entertainment and Yager Development. Publishers include Deep Silver (Plaion), dtp entertainment, Kalypso Media and Nintendo Europe. Bigpoint Games, Gameforge, Goodgame Studios and Wooga are among the world's leading browser game and social network game developers/distributors.

==== United Kingdom ====
The United Kingdom's video game industry is the third largest in the world in terms of developer success and sales of hardware and software by country alone but fourth behind Canada in terms of people employed. The size of the UK game industry is comparable to its film or music industries.

Like most European countries, the UK entered the video game industry through personal computers rather than video game consoles. Low-cost computers like the ZX Spectrum and Amiga 500 led to numerous "bedroom coders" that would make and sell games through mail-order or to distributors that helped to mass-produce them. Coupled with quirky british humour, the "Britsoft" wave of popular games led to a number of influential people and studios in the 1990s. As game programming became more complex and costly in the early 2000s, more traditional studio structures arose to support both personal computers and consoles, with several studios that, in some form or another, remain highly regarded and influential in the present.

Some of the studios have become defunct or been purchased by larger companies such as LittleBigPlanet developer Media Molecule, and Codemasters. The country is home to some of the world's most successful video game franchises, such as Tomb Raider, Grand Theft Auto, Fable, Colin McRae Dirt, and Total War.

The country also went without tax relief until March 21, 2012 when the British government changed its mind on tax relief for UK developers, which without, meant most of the talented development within the UK may move overseas for more profit, along with parents of certain video game developers which would pay for having games developed in the UK. The industry trade body TIGA estimates that it will increase the games development sector's contribution to UK GDP by £283 million, generate £172 million in new and protected tax receipts to HM Treasury, and could cost just £96 million over five years. Before the tax relief was introduced there was a fear that the UK game industry could fall behind other leading game industries around the world such as France and Canada, of which Canada overtook the UK in terms of job numbers in the industry in 2010.

=== Africa ===
The video game industry is still in its infancy throughout the African continent, but due to the continent's young population and increasing technological literacy, the sector is growing rapidly. African countries such as South Africa, Nigeria, and Kenya have been making rapid advances in mobile game development, both within their country and internationally, but due to limited funding and a market overcrowded with Western games, success has thus far been minimal.

=== Asia ===
==== Bangladesh ====
Video gaming is a relatively new sector in Bangladesh. Games have been developed since 2002, mostly independently. However, from 2014, some IT companies have started to develop video games commercially. Some research has been carried out at various universities to improve the video game development sector. In 2020, the first person shooter Zero Hour was released on Steam in Early Access with the version 1.0 being released on September 9, 2024, and has received positive reviews from gamers. It is the first game from Bangladesh to be released on the platform.

==== China ====
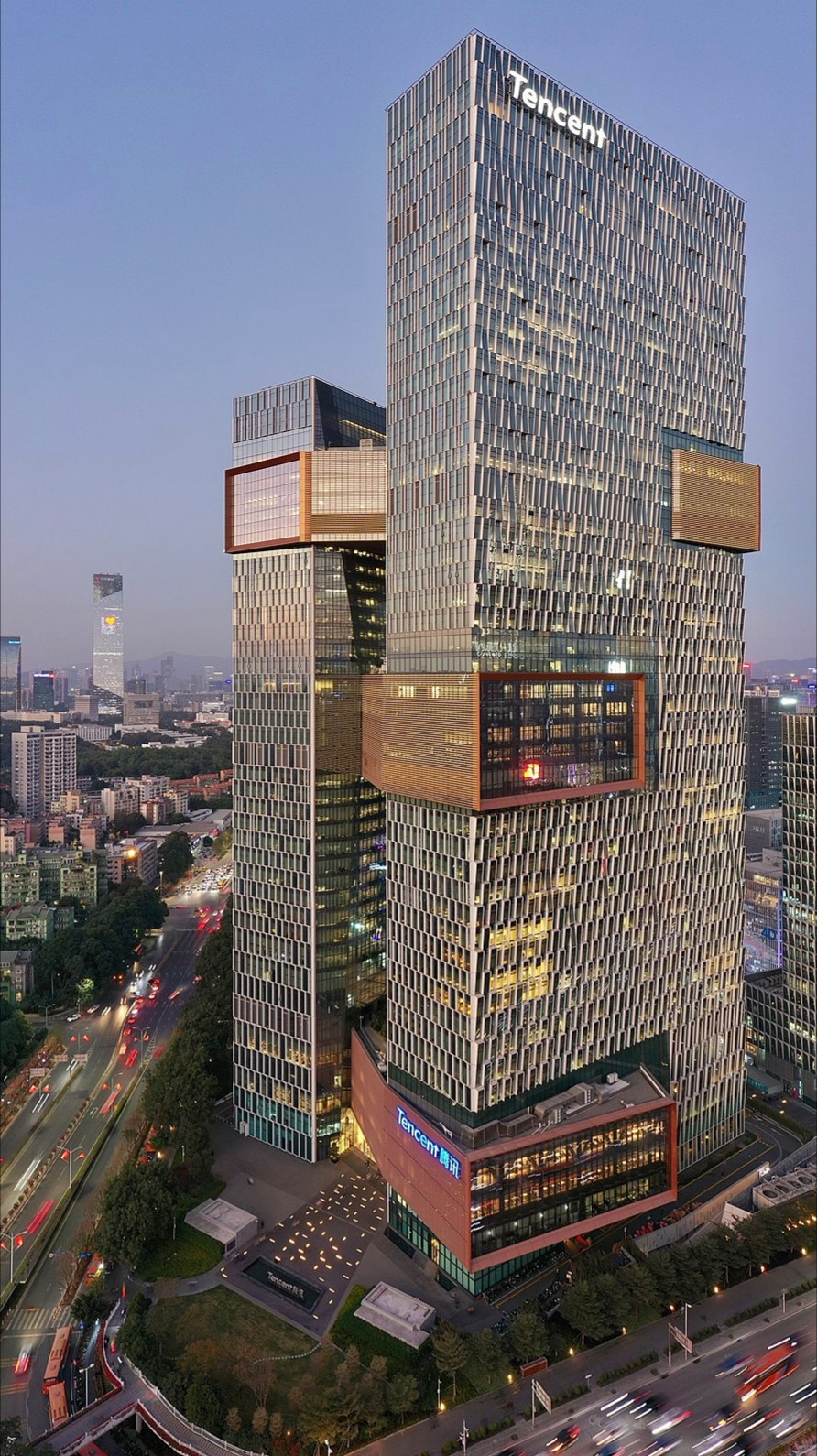
Tencent is the largest company in the world by video game revenue.

China had not been a major factor in the global video game market early on due to economic factors, governmental oversight, and a black market for foreign products. The government initiated a ban on video game consoles in 2000 that lasted through 2014, during which China's video game market grew for personal computer games, particularly subscription-based and microtransaction-based ones that were amenable to use in PC cafes, and later into mobile games. Media publishers like Tencent and NetEase focused on these types of games, growing successfully during the 2010s to become leading international companies. As of 2015, China's video game market revenue exceeds that of the United States, and is the largest country by both revenue and number of players. China is also the largest contributor towards esports in both revenue and in the number of professional players from the country. The industry, like most media in China, is tightly controlled by the government, with strong restrictions on what content may be in games, and incorporation of anti-addiction measures to limit playtime. It is home to Asia Game Show, the largest game convention in the world by attendance.

==== Japan ====
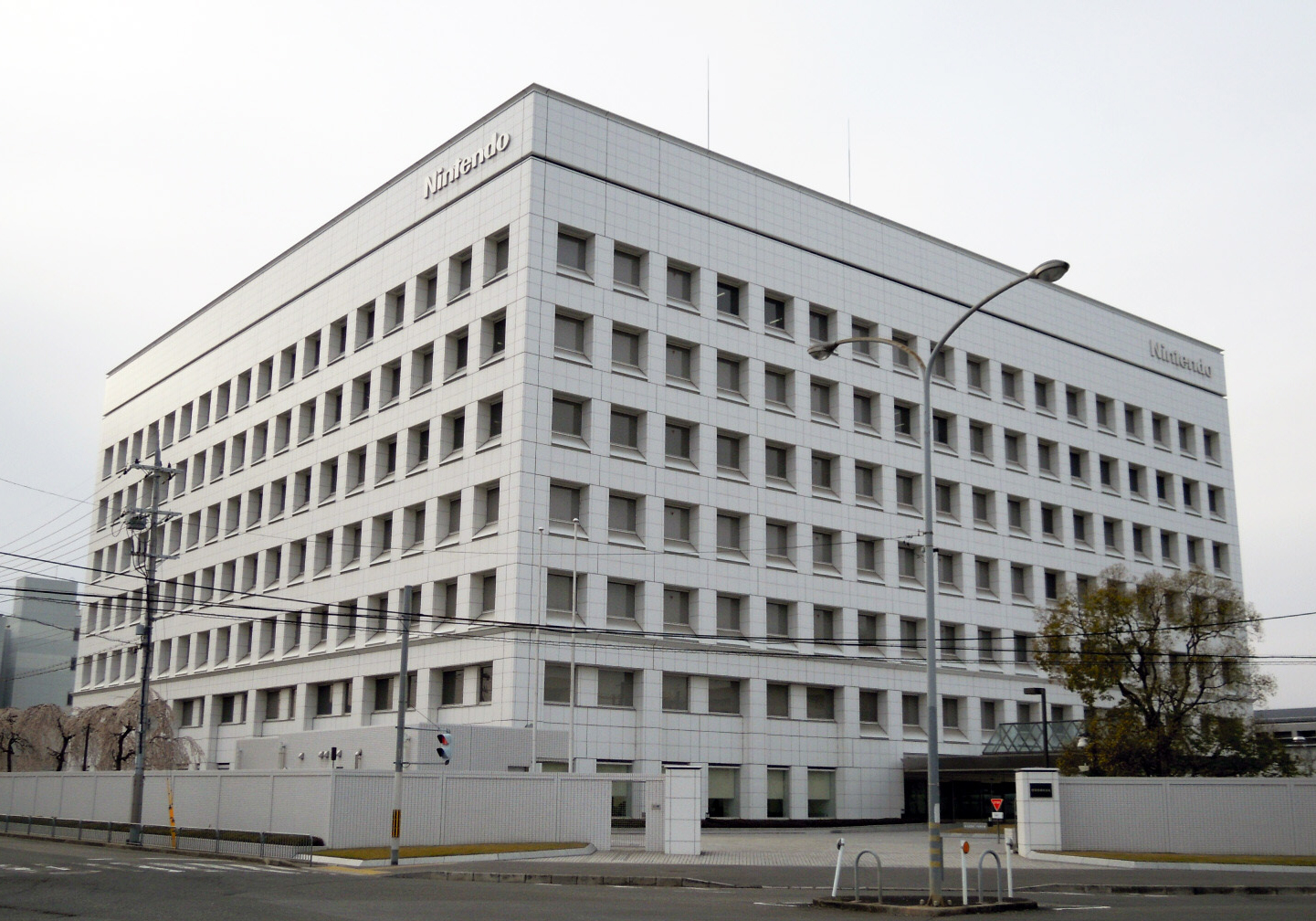
Headquarters of Nintendo in Kyoto, Japan, 2006

The Japanese video game industry is markedly different from the industry in North America, Europe and Australia. Japan initially trailed the United States in entering the video game sector as its companies followed trends set by their American partners, but started to pioneer their own ideas soon after. Several Japanese-developed arcade games, such as Space Invaders, helped to usher in the golden age of arcade video games from 1978 to 1982. The 1983 video game crash that affected the North American market did have small but short-term effects in Japan, as most companies involved in the business were well-established and could weather the disruption. Nintendo took the opportunity to push the Nintendo Entertainment System, a rebranding of its Famicom system, into the Western markets after the crash, implementing technical and business practices to avoid the factors that created the 1983 crash but also secured its control on what games were published for the system. Japan became the dominant home for consoles and console games through the early 2000s, challenged only by the incorporation of large publishers in the West and the Xbox line of consoles from Microsoft. Nintendo along with companies like Sega, Sony Interactive Entertainment, and Capcom are dominant leaders in the Japanese video game industry.

Nintendo created some of the most positively-reviewed and best-selling video game series such as Mario, Donkey Kong, The Legend of Zelda, Metroid and Pokémon.

In recent years, consoles and arcade games have both been overtaken by downloadable free-to-play games on the PC and mobile platforms.

==== India ====
Video gaming in India is an emerging market since India is experiencing strong growth in online gaming, making it one of the top gaming markets in the world. Over the past few decades, the Indian gaming industry has gone from close to nonexistent in the 1990s to one of the top markets globally in the late 2010s. In 2019, the online gaming market in India was estimated at ₹6,200 crore (US$660 million) with an estimated 300 million gamers, a 41.6% increase from 2018. As of 2021, it is one of the top five mobile gaming markets in the world. The industry is projected to reach 510 million gamers by 2022.

==== South Korea ====
The video game industry in South Korea generally followed the same early trends as the Japanese market, but players started focusing on massively-multiplayer online games (MMO) and other games that could be played at PC bangs (Internet cafes). South Korea was one of the first major regions involved in esports in the 1990s and 2000s, and today a large number of professional esports players originate from South Korea.

==== Taiwan ====
The video game industry in Taiwan developed along a markedly different path from that of North America, Europe, and Japan. In the 1980s, limited copyright awareness and the high cost of legitimate software led many Taiwanese companies to focus on distributing and modifying imported titles.

By the early 1990s, however, Taiwan began to cultivate its own game development scene, with companies like Softstar Entertainment producing influential role-playing titles such as The Legend of Sword and Fairy and the Xuan-Yuan Sword series, both of which became cultural touchstones across the Sinophone world. The release of and transition to Windows 95 initially disrupted Taiwan's PC game development, but studios adapted quickly, and by the late 1990s a wave of domestic games achieved notable commercial success.

In the 2000s, the rapid rise of broadband Internet and online gaming reshaped the market. Many studios shifted toward online games and licensed publishing, though the domestic single‑player market declined under pressure from piracy and growing development costs. The era also marked the rise of Taiwan's first professional esports events. In 2003, the Taipei Game Show started attracting international developers and audiences, further embedding online games into Taiwan's youth culture.

Today, Taiwan's game industry is characterized by a mix of smaller independent studios and established publishers, as well as its vibrant esports scene, with tournaments drawing large audiences and significant sponsorships. For example, a Taiwanese gamer – named Chen Yin-hung – won the Apex Legends championship at 2025's Esports World Cup held in Saudi Arabia, earning the championship and the tournament's most valuable player title, becoming the first Taiwanese player to achieve both distinctions. In 2022, with an estimated total of 17.1 million gamers, the value of Taiwan's digital gaming market exceeded US$2.2 billion, with mobile gaming accounting for the largest share of 63.8%. According to Taiwan's Ministry of Culture, the nation is both a significant consumer and a producer of online and mobile games, with a growing number of developers and art studios contributing to international projects.

=== Oceania ===
==== Australia and New Zealand ====
Australia and New Zealand have an active video game industry, with several standalone developers as well as additional studios from other major developers across the globe.

== Conventions, trade shows, and conferences ==
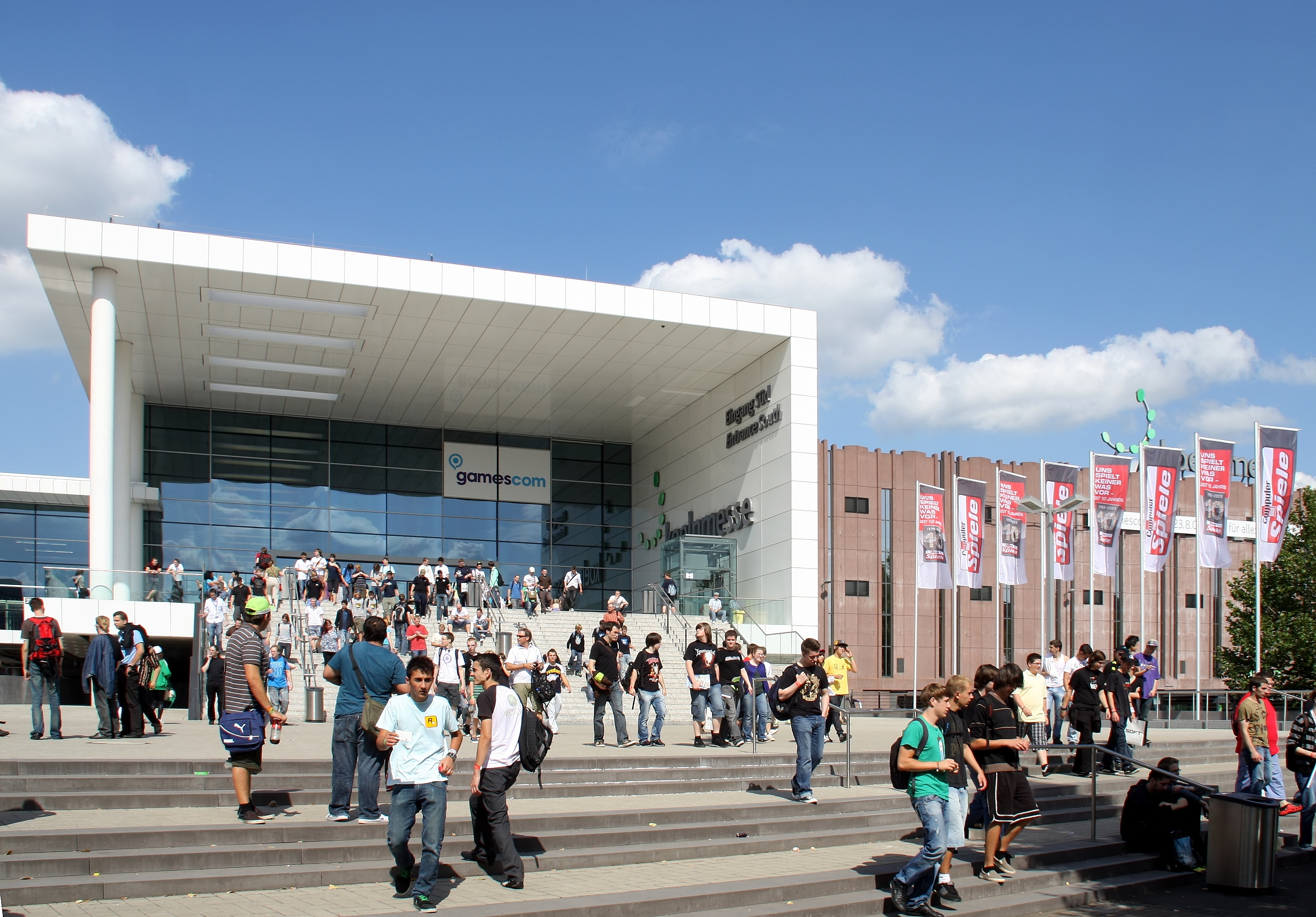
The Gamescom in Cologne, the largest video game fair by attendance

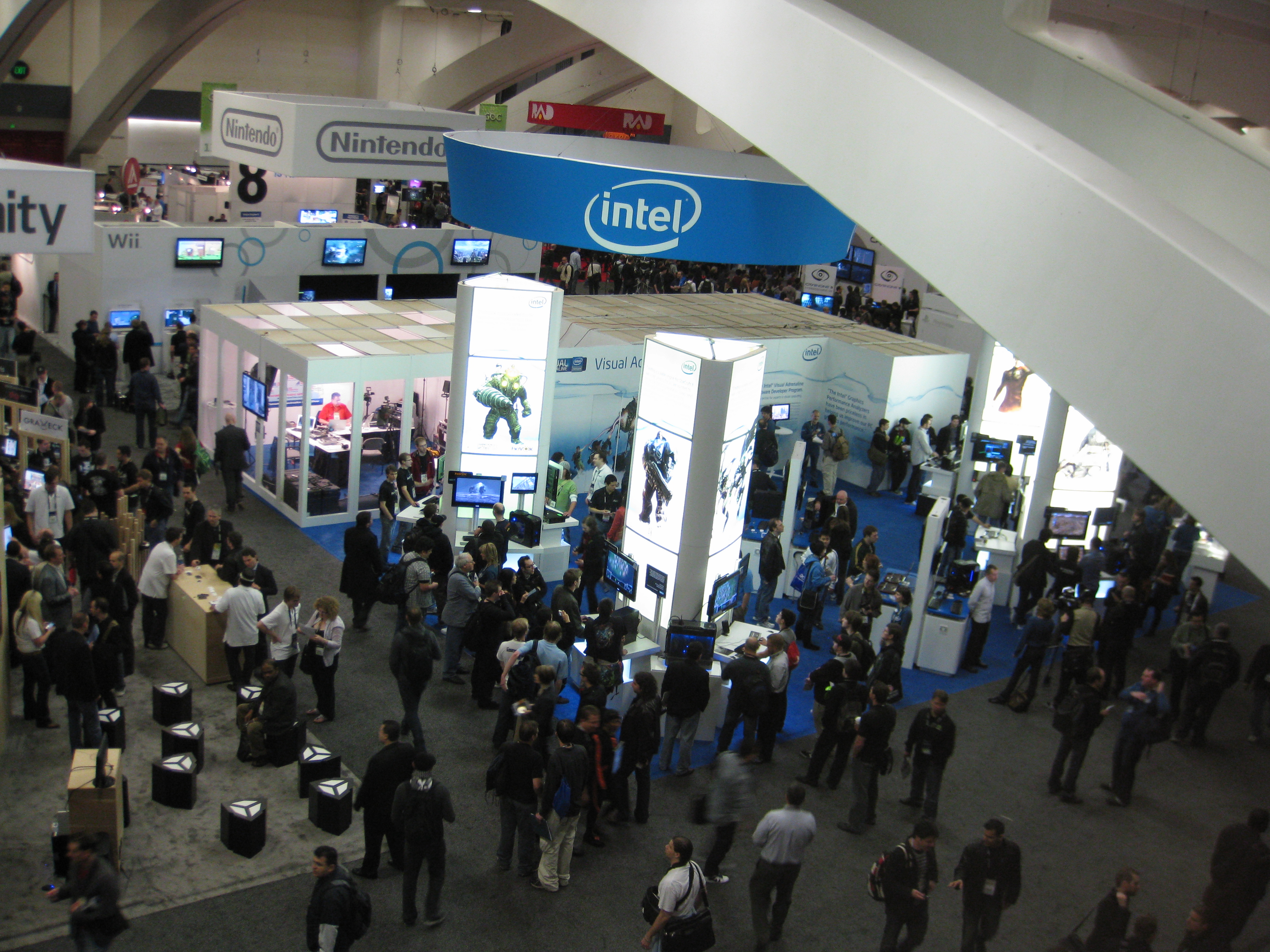
The expo floor at the 2010 Game Developers Conference

Gaming conventions are an important showcase of the industry. These typically provide the means for developers and publishers to demonstrate their games directly to video game players and consumers and obtain feedback. New games are frequently introduced during these events. Some examples of each conventions include the annual Gamescom in Cologne, and numerous PAX events. Some publishers, developers and technology producers also have their own regular conventions, with BlizzCon, QuakeCon, Nvision and the X shows being prominent examples.

National trade groups that support their local video game industry often will hold trade shows aimed for developers and publishers to interact more directly with the video game media, and with retailers and distributors for planning future sales of products. The largest such trade show was E3 in Los Angeles, California is held by the Entertainment Software Association. Other similar trade shows include Tokyo Game Show (Japan), Brasil Game Show (Brazil), EB Games Expo (Australia), KRI (Russia), ChinaJoy (China) and the annual Game Developers Conference.

The development of video games is also a topic of academic and professional interest, leading to a number of conferences for developers to share their knowledge with others. Two of the major professional conferences include the Game Developers Conference (GDC), which holds multiple events through the year but with its main annual conference held in March in San Francisco, and the D.I.C.E. Summit run by the Academy of Interactive Arts & Sciences in February of each year in Las Vegas, Nevada.

== Media coverage and archiving ==
The coverage of the video game industry started off with several magazines covering the topic, but as the Internet became widely available to support new media, much of the dedicated coverage of the video game industry has transitioned to detected websites, including Gamasutra, IGN, Eurogamer, Polygon and GameSpot. More recently, the effect of social media influencers, video game players that create online videos or stream themselves playing games through services like Twitch, have also become a significant source for coverage of video game news from the consumer point of view.

Another facet of tracking the history of the video game industry is video game preservation, a process that is complicated due to game hardware technology that can become obsolete, dependencies on decommissioned online servers, and issues over intellectual property that legally restricts preservation efforts. Much of the industry's history prior to the 1983 crash has been lost, as companies affected by the crash simply threw material away, leaving little to recover today. There is better awareness of video game preservation into the 21st century, and several groups and museums have been established to collect and preserve hardware and software for the industry.

== Recognition within the industry ==
The video game industry has a number of annual award ceremonies, commonly associated with the above conventions, trade shows, and conferences, as well as standalone award shows. Many of the dedicated video game journalism websites also have their own set of awards. Most commonly, these ceremonies are capped by the top prize, the "Game of the Year".

== Mental health outcomes ==
A landmark 2025 study in Nature Communications shows that playing strategy videogames can slow down neural aging. Researchers found that complex gameplay forces the brain to adapt, making neural networks operate four to seven years younger than average. This happens because intense decision making and planning trigger neuroplasticity which builds up stronger connections to key brain areas. Instead of just being entertainment, these games serve as a genuine workout for your mind. Overall strategic gaming proves to be a powerful tool for boosting brain heath and preserving sharp focus.

== Trends ==
Players become fourth-party developers, allowing for more open source models of game design, development and engineering. Players also create modifications (mods), which in some cases become just as popular as the original game for which they were created. An example of this is the game Counter-Strike, which began as a mod of the video game Half-Life and eventually became a very successful, published game in its own right.

While this "community of modifiers" may only add up to approximately 1% of a particular game's user base, the number of those involved will grow as more games offer modifying opportunities (such as, by releasing source code) and the video user base swells. According to Ben Sawyer, as many as 600,000 established online game community developers existed as of 2012. This effectively added a new component to the game industry value chain and if it continues to mature, it will integrate itself into the overall industry.

The industry has seen a shift towards games with multiplayer facilities. A larger percentage of games on all types of platforms include some type of competitive online multiplayer capability.

In addition, the industry is experiencing further significant change driven by convergence, with technology and player comfort being the two primary reasons for this wave of industry convergence. Video games and related content can now be accessed and played on a variety of media, including: cable television, dedicated consoles, handheld devices and smartphones, through social networking sites or through an ISP, through a game developer's website, and online through a game console and/or home or office personal computer. In fact, 12% of U.S. households already make regular use of game consoles for accessing video content provided by online services such as Hulu and Netflix. In 2012, for the first time, entertainment usage passed multiplayer game usage on Xbox, meaning that users spent more time with online video and music services and applications than playing multiplayer games. This rapid type of industry convergence has caused the distinction between video game console and personal computers to disappear. A game console with high-speed microprocessors attached to a television set is, for all intents and purposes, a computer and monitor.

As this distinction has been diminished, players' willingness to play and access content on different platforms has increased. The growing video gamer demographic accounts for this trend, as former president of the Entertainment Software Association Douglas Lowenstein explained at the 10th E3 expo, "Looking ahead, a child born in 1995, E3's inaugural year, will be 19 years old in 2014. And according to Census Bureau data, by the year 2020, there will be 174 million Americans between the ages of 5 and 44. That's 174 million Americans who will have grown up with PlayStations, Xboxes, and GameCubes from their early childhood and teenage years...What this means is that the average gamer will be both older and, given their lifetime familiarity with playing interactive games, more sophisticated and discriminating about the games they play."

Evidence of the increasing player willingness to play video games across a variety of media and different platforms can be seen in the rise of casual gaming on smartphones, tablets, and social networking sites as 92% of all smartphone and tablet owners play games at least once a week, 45% play daily, and industry estimates predict that, by 2016, one-third of all global mobile video game revenue will come from tablets alone. Apple's App Store alone has more than 90,000 game apps, a growth of 1,400% since it went online. In addition, game revenues for iOS and Android mobile devices now exceed those of both Nintendo and Sony handheld video game systems combined.

== See also ==
- List of video games
- List of video game websites
- Film and television adaptations of video games
