= Karatina =

Town in Nyeri County, Kenya

Coordinates: 0.4817°S 37.1251°E

Karatina is a town in Nyeri County, Kenya which hosts a municipal council and serves as the headquarters of Mathira East subcounty. Karatina municipality had a total population of 6,852, all classified as urban in the 1999 census It has six electoral wards, all in the Mathira Constituency; the remaining five wards of Mathira constituency represent Nyeri County Council.

== Geography ==
Karatina is on the Nairobi – Nyeri highway, 25 kilometres southeast of Nyeri town and south of Mount Kenya. It is at an elevation of 1,868 metres (6,129 ft).

== History ==
Karatina has been a popular open air market before the colonial period, and after. One suggestion for the name source is that trade took place under a muratina tree, hence the name Karatina. During World War II a dried vegetable factory was built in Karatina, providing the people with dried fruits. Other people (who?)think the town's name came from the English name 'quarantine' that locals pronounced as 'karantina'.

== Health ==
There are two major hospitals in Karatina, the government-funded Karatina General Hospital and the private Jamii Hospital. In addition, PCEA TumuTumu Hospital is a few miles west of Karatina.

== Economy ==
Karatina town hosts the largest open air market in Kenya and the People living in Karatina are known to be very active with most economic operations beginning at 4am and ending at 10pm. More than 90% are Kikuyus which form the largest tribe in Kenya. There are many auxiliary services and the town is rich in agricultural products are well. There is an ideal mix of urban and rural life. The town also hosts major banks and saccos showing the economic undertone of the town. The banks include Absa, Equity Bank, NCBA, Family Bank, DTB, KWFT, National Bank, KCB and many more.

In 2017 one of the Uchumi Supermarkets branch got shut down in Karatina.

In 2018, Maguna brand of supermarkets opened 2 Supermarkets within the town. The town also plays host to another supermarket; Maathai Supermarket.

With the resumption of railway transport and the completion of Kenol-Marua super highway it is hoped that investors will relocate to Karatina.

== Schools and universities ==
- Kanyama Secondary School
- Karatina University
- Karatina DEB Primary School
- Kirigu Primary School
- Ruthagati High School
- Kirimara high school
- Queen of Peace Karatina Catholic Academy
- Rafina Academy
- Gathehu Secondary School
- Karatina Special School for the Mentally Handicapped
- Mathaithi Girls High School
- Kanjuri High School
