= Video games in Canada =

The video game industry in Canada consists of approximately 32,300 employees across 937 companies. In 2021, the industry generated an estimated US$3.4 billion in revenue, having grown by 20% since 2019. Video game development is beginning to rival the film and television production industry as a major contributor to the Canadian economy.

== History ==
The first documented commercial Canadian video game release was Les Têtards, published by Logidisque in 1982. However, the first video games developed in Canada that gained substantial commercial success were Evolution and BC's Quest for Tires, both released in 1983. Chris Gray and Peter Liepa, from Toronto and Ottawa respectively, together created Boulder Dash in 1983 which was later acquired and published by First Star Software.

Since the late 1990s companies began moving from the West Coast to Ontario and Quebec, where there is more government support for studios and the cost of living is lower. For example, Ubisoft opened Ubisoft Montreal in 1997 with government incentives. The studio has since grown to be one of the largest single-location studios by employee count and led other video game developers to launch studios in Montreal, including Electronic Arts and Warner Bros. Interactive Entertainment. Montreal itself saw a growth in younger professionals coming to the city, not only in video game programming but other technology fields. Ubisoft has since expanded out to other Canadian cities, including Ubisoft's Montreal sister studios Ubisoft Quebec and Ubisoft Saguenay. However, this draw to the eastern side of Canada has left Vancouver, also once similarly thriving with video game developers, seeing its impact on the industry wane.

== Demographics ==
In 2015, approximately 19 million Canadians identified as gamers (54% of the Canadian population). The average Canadian gamer was 33 years old; 52% were male, with 48% female. Console game revenue fell 32% from 2013 to 2015 but still accounted for 35% of the revenue produced by Canada's video games industry. Canadians tend to prefer consoles over portable gaming. Mobile games saw an increase in revenue of 20% from 2013 to 2015, and accounted for 31% of the total revenue earned by Canada's video games industry. Computer game sales fell marginally (3%) and composed 25% of the industry's revenue. The most popular game genres in Canada are, in order of most to least popular, action-adventures, family games, and shooters.

== Research ==
There has recently been a substantial amount of interest in the emergence of video game development as an industry in Canada and its impact on the economy, the creative industries, the role studios play in specific city ecosystems and how video games affect people physically and mentally. A recent study was done at McMaster University studying how playing video games improves the eyesight of those who suffer from problems pertaining to eyesight. Montreal, Quebec, is a particularly popular subject of study due to the maturity of the gaming industry and its overall urban ecology.

== Video game industry ==
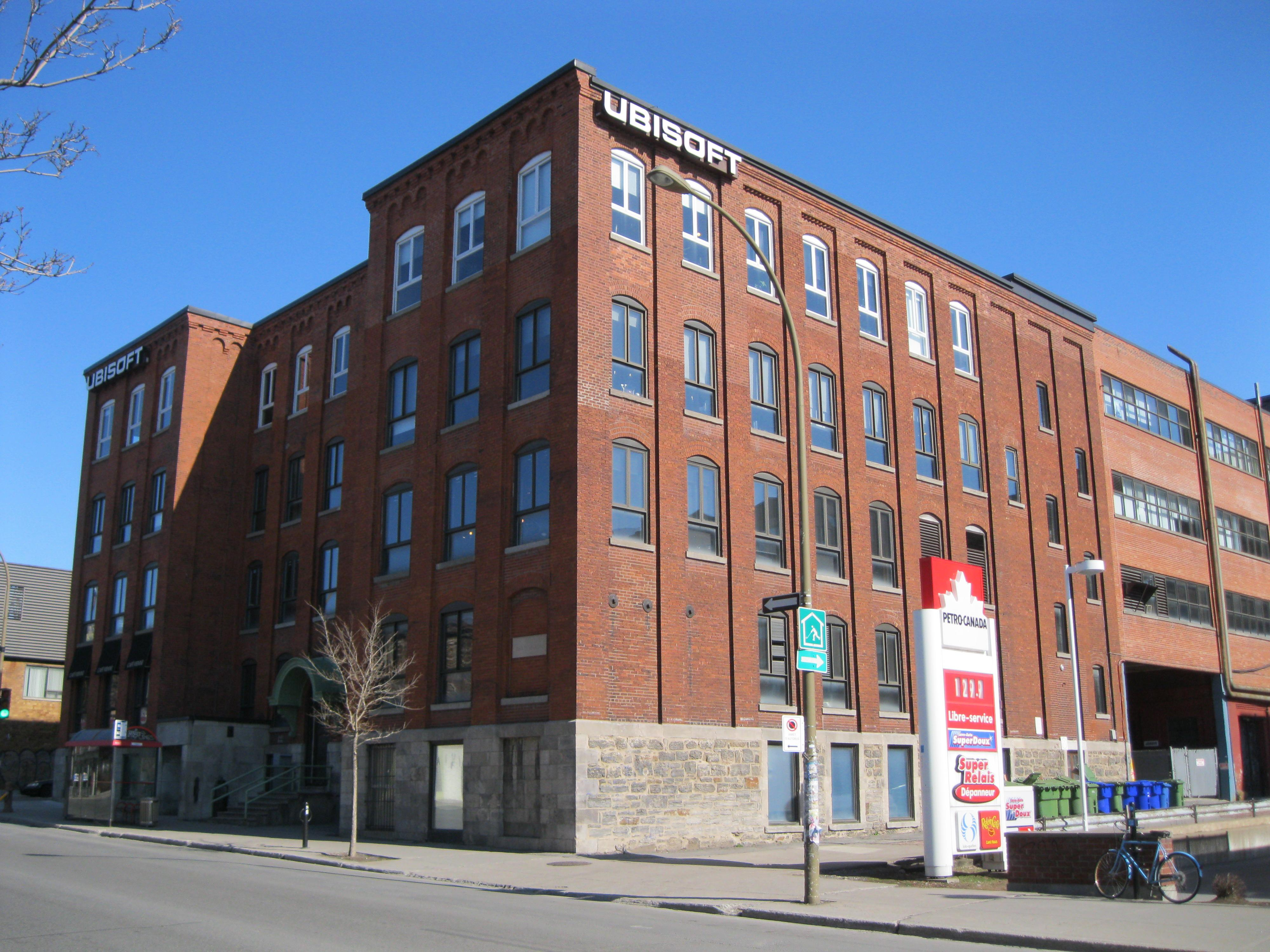
Ubisoft studios in Montreal, one of many game studios in the province of Quebec.

80% of all Canadian game studios are located in Quebec, British Columbia and Ontario. Ontario is the largest producer of video games in Canada, housing 31.8% of all game studios (10 of which are large companies) and has annual expenditures of $818.4 million. Quebec is the second largest, with 31.1% of companies residing in the province (22 of which are large companies) and spends $2.3 billion annually. The third largest video game producer is British Columbia, which has 17.2% of all game studios (19 of which are large companies) and has annual expenditures of $1 billion.

=== Education ===
Many Canadian post-secondary institutions offer industry relevant courses in areas such as computer programming, animation/concept art, and game design. Many of the top programs are offered in either Vancouver, British Columbia or Toronto, Ontario and the Greater Toronto Area. As of 2021, industry employees earned an average of $78,600 annually and the average age of an employee in this industry was 32 years old. According to a 2015 report from the Entertainment Software Association of Canada, the skills that are most lacking in current recruitment pools are programming, art and animation, game design and data analysis. As of 2016 it was anticipated that approximately 1,377 new jobs will be filled in the next 12–24 months, with approximately 40% being intermediate or senior level creative positions and approximately 60% being intermediate or senior level technical jobs.

=== Studios ===
Canada is home to some of the biggest studios in the industry. Edmonton, Alberta, hosts BioWare and Prince Edward Island is home to Other Ocean Interactive. EA Canada, located in Burnaby, British Columbia, is a major contributor to the industry with popular, global franchises such as FIFA and Need for Speed and has 4 other studios in Canada (Charlottetown, Edmonton, Kitchener and Montreal). Rockstar Vancouver was a sizeable contributor to the Vancouver gaming scene, as well as another Rockstar studio in Toronto. Ubisoft Montreal is the lead studio for the Far Cry series, also contributing to the Assassin's Creed franchise. They, as well as Warner Brothers Interactive (also based in Montreal), are attracting other video game developers and studios to the city. Ubisoft Toronto is also a large contributor to the Far Cry franchise as well as Splinter Cell Blacklist.

=== Media ===
While Canada may have smaller representation in the games media space than other countries, there are a few active publications. Some examples are GCMagazine, and GCR. There are also larger publications that include gaming as a topic among broader coverage. Examples include MobileSyrup, ScreenRant, and CBC. Large scale gaming events such as the Canadian Videogame Awards, Fan Expo Canada and Comic-Con help to promote the industry and encourage its growth.

== See also ==
- Game Design Expo
- Montreal International Games Summit
- Video game crash of 1983
