= Mathira Constituency =

Electoral district of Kenya

Mathira Constituency is an electoral constituency in Kenya. It is one of six constituencies in Nyeri County. The constituency was established for the 1963 elections. Mathira is popularly known as Mathira ya Githomo (education) due to a significant number of an educated population in the country. It sits at the foot of Mount Kenya, creating a conducive climate for growing tea and coffee. Karatina is to the east of Mathira constituency. Several tarmac roads criss-cross Mathira, including the Kenol-Marua superhighway.

Education institutions include Karatina University, Tumutumu Girls High School, Kanjuri High School, Karatina Girls, Karatina Special School for the Mentally Handicapped, and Bishop Gatimu Ngandu Girls High School. Health facilities include Karatina Hospital, Jamii Hospital, PCEA Tumutumu Hospital and many dispensaries.

Kagochi Tea Factory is the largest private employer and Mountain Lodge leads in tourism.

== Members of Parliament ==
Elections	MP	Party	Notes
1963	Anderson Kangeri Wamuthenya	KANU	One-party system
1969	Davidson Ngibuini Kuguru	KANU	One-party system
1974	Davidson Ngibuini Kuguru	KANU	One-party system
1979	Davidson Ngibuini Kuguru	KANU	One-party system
1983	Eliud Matu Wamae	KANU	One-party system.
1988	Davidson Ngibuini Kuguru	KANU	One-party system.
1992	Eliud Matu Wamae	Democratic Party	
1997	Eliud Matu Wamae	Democratic Party	
2002	James Nderitu Gachagua	NARC	
2007	Ephraim Mwangi Maina	Safina	
March 2013	Peter Weru	The National Alliance	
August 2017	Rigathi Gachagua	JP	
August 2022	Eric Mwangi Kahugu	UDA	

== Wards ==
Ward	Registered Voters	Local authority
Commercial	3,520	Karatina municipality
Hospital	2,756	Karatina municipality
Iria-ini (Mathira)	11,981	Nyeri County
Kirimukuyu	14,561	Nyeri County
Konyu	13,961	Nyeri County
Magutu	11,087	Nyeri County
Market	3,694	Karatina municipality
Ngorano	12,242	Nyeri County
Railway	3,704	Karatina municipality
Residential	3,596	Karatina municipality
Stadium	4,193	Karatina municipality
Total	85,295	
*September 2005,
