= Karatina University =

Public university in Kenya

- Former names: Karatina University College (2010-2013); Moi University Central Kenya Campus (2007-2010)
- Motto: Inspiring Innovation and Leadership
- Type: Public
- Established: 2013 - Karatina University (gained university status); 2010 - Karatina University College
- Vice-Chancellor: Prof Linus M Gitonga
- Students: 10,000
- Location: Karatina, Kenya; 0.4811°S 37.1278°E
- Website: http://www.karu.ac.ke

Karatina University is a chartered public university in the town of Karatina, in central Kenya.

== History ==
Karatina University was founded in 2007 as a Moi University campus for central Kenya, called the Moi University Central Kenya Campus. Located in Kagochi about 15 km north of the town of Karatina in Mathira-East sub-county, Nyeri county. it had an original intake of 100 students. Three years later, in 2010, it was upgraded to a constituent college of Moi University, and renamed Karatina University College. In 2013, the institution was declared a university in its own right, and was renamed Karatina University.

== Campus ==
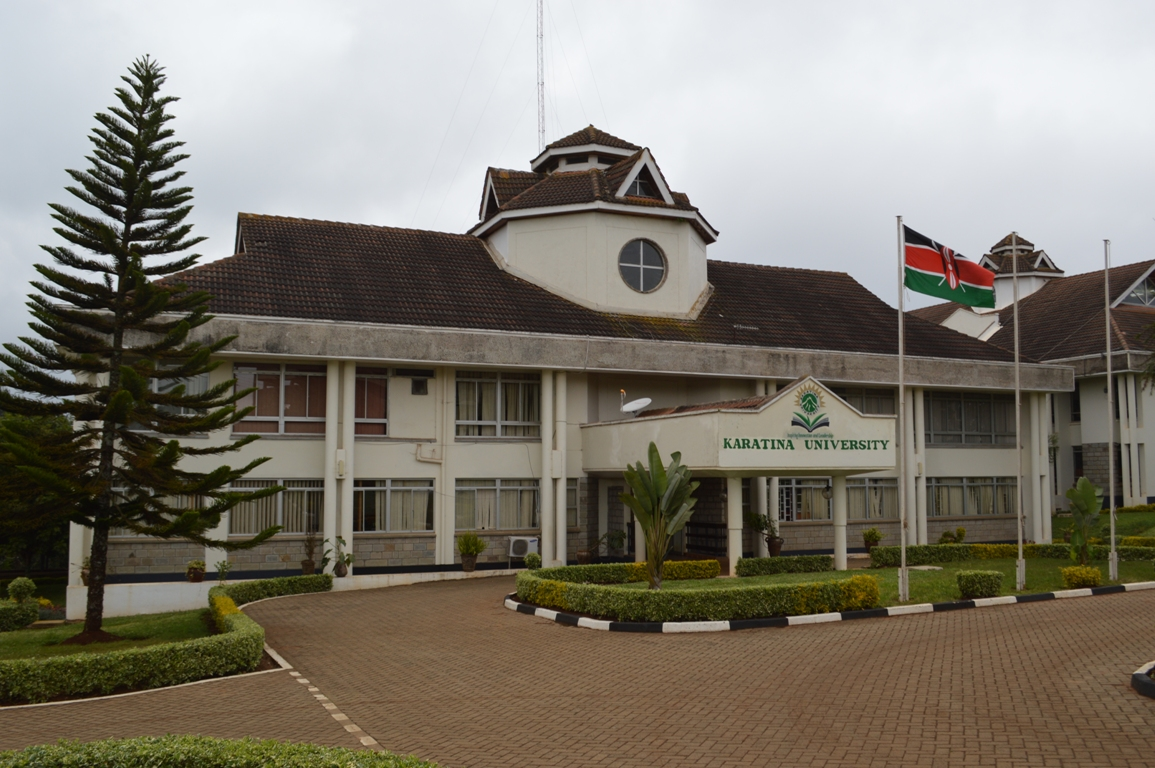
Karatina University administration block

Karatina University's main campus is located at Kagochi, the site of the former Karatina University College about 15 km from Karatina town. Other campuses formerly located in the town of Nanyuki, Karatina and in the settlement of Itiati, have since been annexed to the main campus as from August 2024; beginning of the 2024/25 academic year.

The Vice Chancellor of Karatina University is Prof. Linus M Gitonga.

== Structure and organisation ==
Karatina University comprises academic schools, each divided into different departments:

- School of Agriculture & Biotechnology;
- School of Business;
- School of Education & Social Sciences;
- School of Natural Resources & Environmental Studies;
- School of Pure and Applied Sciences;
- School of Health Sciences;

School of Agriculture and Biotechnology

- Food Science and Nutrition
- Agricultural Resource Economics
- Crop Science

School of Business Studies

- Business and Entrepreneurship
- Human Resources Development
- Tourism and Hospitality Management
- Economics and National Development

School of Education and Social Science

- Humanities & Languages
- Social Sciences
- Education Foundation
- Planning and Curriculum
- Psychology and Communication Technology

School of Natural Resources & Environmental Studies

- Natural Resources
- Environmental Studies
- Aquaculture and Fisheries Management
- Earth Sciences and Geo-informatics

School of Pure and Applied Sciences

- Mathematics, Statistics & Actuarial Sciences
- Computer Science
- Physical Sciences
- Biological Sciences
- information technology

School of Nursing and Medical Courses

- Nursing
- Health Systems Management
- Human Nutrition and Dietetics
- Medical Laboratory Technology
- Clinical Medicine

== Academic profile ==
=== Rankings ===
Karatina University is currently ranked number 29 in Kenya on Webometrics Ranking of World Universities, which measures an institution's web presence.

== See also ==
- University of Kabianga
