= Davidson Ngibuini Kuguru =

Kenyan politician

Davidson Ngibuini Kuguru was a Kenyan MP who represented Mathira Constituency in the National Assembly.
