= Video games in South Africa =

The video games sector in South Africa is one of the largest video games markets and Esports scenes in Africa. The video games sector has overtaken the South African market in movies and music in market value and is still rapidly increasing. In 2016 the South African games industry advocacy group, Interactive Entertainment South Africa, stated that the video game market in the country was worth R2.2 billion (US$ 139 million) whilst the domestic games industry was worth R58 million (US$ 5.46 million) in 2014. A 2021 study by Newzoo and Carry1st estimated that 40% (24 million people) of sub-Saharan Africa's video game playing population were located in South Africa.

== Game development ==
The country has produced over 60 domestic game development studios such as Free Lives, Celestial Games, 24 Bit Games and Luma Arcade; with the majority them being micro-enterprises that employ less than five people; only six of these studios employ more than ten people. Most studios are based in or around the cities of Cape Town and Johannesburg.

Over 90% of South African game development studios report using the Unity game development engine.

=== Industry challenges ===
A lack of local investment and government support in addition to a shortage of game development skills have been identified as key challenges for the industry. Other important challenges include inflexible currency exchange regulations and onerous registration requirements imposed by the South African Films and Publications Board. Since 2016 the Departments of Sports, Art and Culture and Department of Trade and Industry have been discussing which department will take the authority of handling the rights of game developers thereby creating uncertainty within the industry of whom to talk to in government. Due to the difficulties of doing business as a game developer in the country over 80% of game development studios tend to relocate overseas once they become established.

== South African games ==
Notable video games developed in South Africa include:

- Blastar (1984) – notable for being developed by Elon Musk
- Toxic Bunny (1996)
- The Tainted (~2000)
- Chase: Hollywood Stunt Driver (2002)
- Football Genius: The Ultimate Quiz (2009)
- Monty Python's Cow Tossing (2011)
- Toxic Bunny HD (2012)
- Desktop Dungeons (2013)
- Broforce (2015)
- Albert & Otto (2015)
- Stasis (2015)
- Vietnam '65 (2015)
- Viscera Cleanup Detail (2015)
- Destiny of Ancient Kingdoms (2016)
- Afghanistan '11 (2017)
- Semblance (2018)
- Death in the Water series (2019 debut)
- Gorn (2019)
- Boet Fighter (2019)
- Beautiful Desolation (2020)
- Nemesis Island (Dec 2022)
- Nine Noir Lives (2022)
- Terra Nil (2023)
- Hadley's Run: A Starship Saga (2024)
- World Turtles (2024)
- Poached: Hunt the Hunter (2023, EA)
- Metavoidal (2025)
- Relooted (2026)
- WarpedSpace (TBA, 2026? EA.)
- Feather’s Edge (TBA, 2027?)
- Cyber Courier 2088 (TBA, 2027?)
- Stream Dogfighter (TBA, 2027? EA.)

== Gaming scene ==
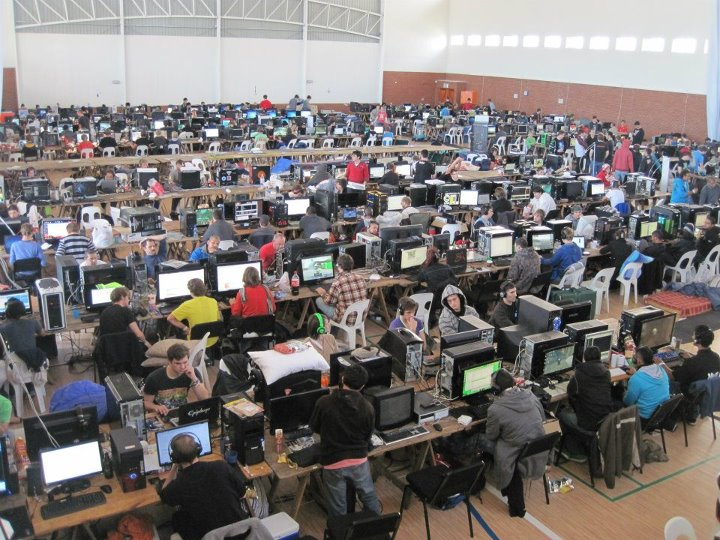
A LAN party taking place in Cape Town

Big tech companies like MWEB and Telkom host local server game servers which exponentially helps improve gaming in South Africa. This assists the improvement of local competitive gaming and brings the local gaming community together easier.

=== Streaming ===
A growing number of South Africans are becoming professional game streamers on platforms such as Twitch and YouTube.

=== Competitive gaming ===
The country's biggest LAN event is the Cape Town based NAG LAN. Plans are being laid out by SuperSport to start an eSport channel with GINX eSports TV as the demand for streaming eSports keeps on growing.

== Compared to the rest of Africa ==
South Africa's video gaming compared to the rest of Africa is unchallenged due to the large number of wealthy South Africans living in cities like Durban, Cape Town, Pretoria, Bloemfontein and Johannesburg. With internet infrastructure being more than sufficient to support esports, and with Fibre being almost fully integrated in cities and wealthy suburban areas, the growth in online gaming can only be motivated. Video game developing in the country is not doing well, but events and eSports organizations like Mind Sports South Africa, the Digital Gaming League, Orena and LANX have jumped up in 2015 with the big demand for eSports tournaments and other video game events in large cities. However, it is only Mind Sports South Africa that continually holds events in all the provinces and runs school events. With gaming in schools also in the rise, Mind Sports South Africa reported in 2019 that there were over 60 schools that participated in the official league.

Nigeria, Kenya and Uganda are the other top game developers in Africa. Their local video game industry is bringing millions of dollars in for their countries per year. This is in all categories of video games: mobile, PC, Xbox, Nintendo, and PlayStation.

South Africa has been dominant in eSports on the continent, and great internationally. The country has made its mark on the eSport scene as the national South African team has participated in every International eSports Federation world Championship since 2009 over a varied number of games and platforms. But Mind Sports South Africa has admitted that the gaming scene in the country needs to mature. Further proof that South Africa is highly respected is that Thomas Brown was selected to referee at the 2016 World Cyber Arena (WCA) in Beijing, and that on August 2016, Jason Batzofin was elected into the International eSports Federation Athletes' Commission.
