= Anger Foot =

2024 video game

- Developer: Free Lives
- Publisher: Devolver Digital
- Producers: Anja "Nanna" Venter; Ruan Rothmann
- Designers: Jem Smith; Robbie Fraser; Jason "Jaybooty" Sutherland
- Programmers: Jem Smith; Robbie Fraser
- Artist: Luc Wolthers
- Writer: Robbie Fraser
- Composer: Jason "Jaybooty" Sutherland
- Engine: Unity
- Platforms: Windows; PlayStation 5
- Release: Windows; July 11, 2024; PlayStation 5; July 1, 2025
- Genre: First-person shooter
- Mode: Single-player

Anger Foot is a first-person shooter video game developed by Free Lives and published by Devolver Digital. Players take on the role of a rogue vigilante who kicks and shoots their way through Shit City, clearing out slums, sewers, and skyscrapers of merciless gangsters. It was released on July 11, 2024 for Windows. It was also released for PlayStation 5 on July 1, 2025.

== Gameplay ==
Anger Foot is a fast-paced action packed game where the player navigates through various levels, kicking down doors to surprise and eliminate enemies while attempting to complete each level as quickly as possible. The primary weapon in the game is the protagonist's foot, a powerful kick that is used to break down doors, destroy obstacles, and eradicate enemies. Additional weapons and power-ups can be picked up while progressing through the levels, allowing players to take a different approach to each situation. Players are able to unlock and upgrade their sneakers at the end of each level with each pair possessing a unique attribute. There are multiple environments to traverse through such as slums, sewers, and skyscrapers, each with diverse enemy types that have different behavior patterns and attacks. The game emphasizes quick reflexes, situational awareness, and fast decision-making to navigate through the different rooms and enemies. Speed and efficiency are rewarded, with players encouraged to complete levels in the shortest time possible. The gameplay is accompanied by a hardstyle soundtrack created to immerse the player in the action packed environment.

== Plot ==
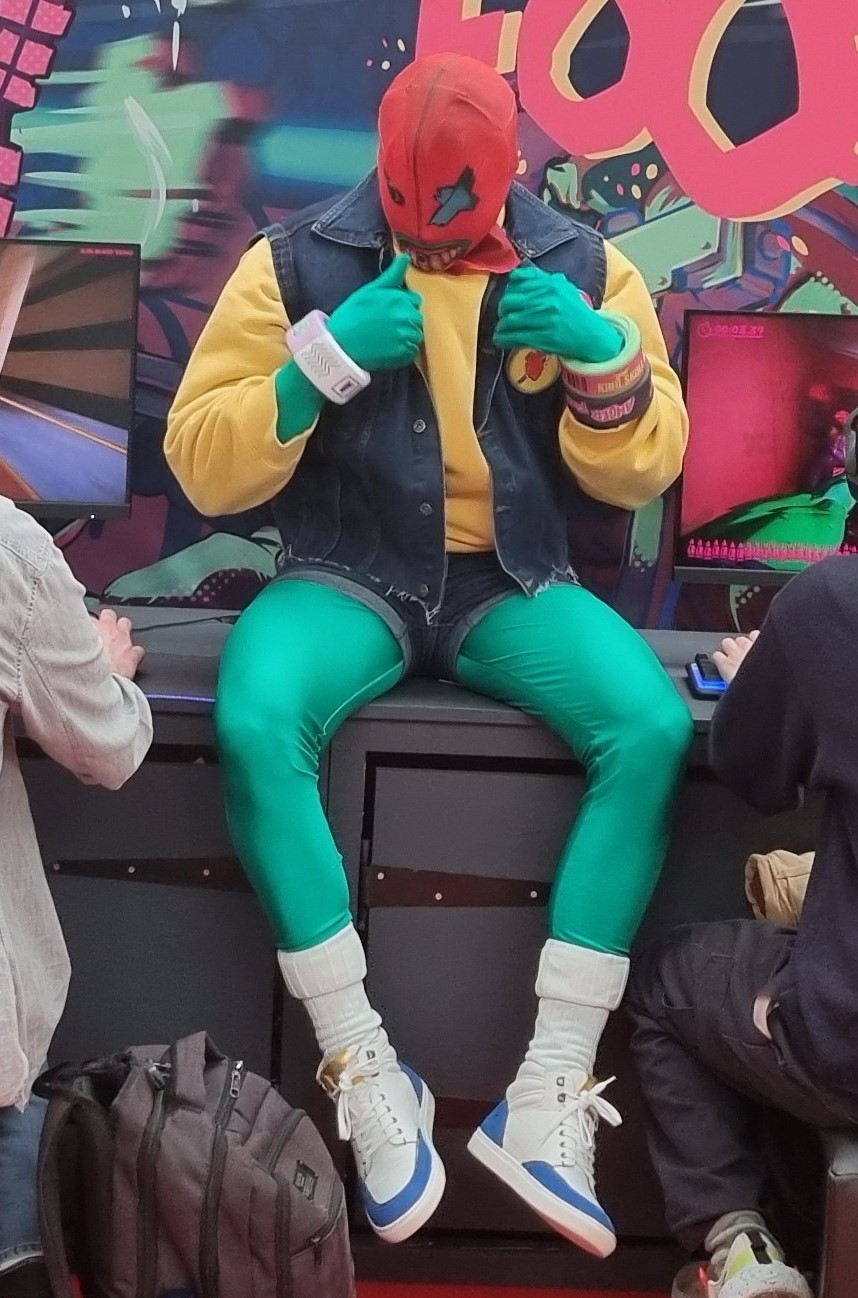
A cosplay of the game's protagonist, Anger Foot, at the Devolver Digital booth at WASD

The game takes place in the dystopia of Shit City, a city where crime isn't just considered the norm, but encouraged - the city is controlled by four gangs: The Violence Gang, who specialize in violent crime; the Pollution Gang, who specialize in environmental crime, the Business Gang who specialize in white-collar crime, and the Debauchery Gang who conduct themselves according to the seven deadly sins and operate a pizza chain and a series of nightclubs, with all four gangs being under the supervision of the shadowy Crime Minister. The protagonist, the titular Anger Foot, visits a slum to buy a pair of valuable sneakers, for which he has to kick in a few faces. Once home, he places the new pair along his three other most valuable ones, only to have his entire collection wall ripped out by a massive helicopter; he learns his four pairs of sneakers have been distributed among the four gangs, so he decides to kick his way through the gangs to retrieve them.

After defeating the four crime bosses (Goo Cop, The Sludge Baron, The CEO and Pizza Pig, respectively) and retrieving the four sneakers, Anger Foot gets a message from the Crime Minister himself, who has taken his remaining sneaker collection hostage and wants to negotiate. Upon arrival, the Crime Minister reveals that tricking the gang bosses to steal Anger Foot's sneakers was his plan all along: now with the gangs eliminated, he can transform Shit City into Nice City, a utopia with no crime; he then asks Anger Foot to demonstrate his commitment to it by kicking his sneaker collection into a fireplace.

If the player chooses to kick the sneakers into the fireplace, Anger Foot is then shown a month later to live alone in the transformed Nice City, where he is dressed as uniformly as everyone else, wearing loafers instead of sneakers and working at a desk job. If the player instead kicks the Crime Minister through the window, nothing changes in Shit City, but Anger Foot gets to finally take his sneakers home and enjoy movie night with his girlfriend.

== Development ==
Anger Foot is developed by Free Lives, an indie game development studio based in Cape Town, South Africa. Free Lives created Anger Foot during a 7-day game development challenge on Itch.io called 7dfps (7 day first person shooter) in 2020. The game was officially announced in collaboration with publisher Devolver Digital at the Devolver Digital Showcase during the Summer Game Fest in June 2022, with an initial release window sometime in 2023. However, in August of the same year, it was announced by Devolver that the game had been delayed to 2024. Free Lives and Devolver Digital have partnered before to release various titles such as Broforce, Genital Jousting, Gorn, Terra Nil, Stick it to the Stickman, and Cricket Through the Ages. Anger Foot appeared at the Devolver Digital booth at WASD gaming expo in London in April 2024.

== Reception ==
Reception

Aggregate scores
Aggregator	Score
Metacritic	77/100
OpenCritic	70% recommend

Review scores
Publication	Score
Digital Trends	2/5
Game Informer	9/10
Hardcore Gamer	4.5/5
PC Gamer (US)	85/100
Shacknews	6/10
Multiplayer.it	7.5/10

Metacritic, which uses a weighted average, assigned Anger Foot a score of 77 out of 100, based on 29 reviews from video game critics, indicating "generally favorable" critical reception. Fellow review aggregator OpenCritic assessed that the game received strong approval, being recommended by 70% of critics.
