= Kerstin Hall =

South African writer

- Education: Rhodes University; University of Cape Town
- Occupations: Novelist; short story writer; editor
- Writing career
- Language: English
- Genres: Science fiction, fantasy
- Website: www.kerstinhall.com

Kerstin Hall is a South African science fiction and fantasy writer. Her works include Star Eater and Asunder.

== Education ==
Hall attended Rhodes University and held a Mandela Rhodes scholarship for her MA at the University of Cape Town.

== Career ==
Hall has worked at several speculative fiction magazines. She was fiction editor for sub-Q and an editorial assistant for Beneath Ceaseless Skies, as well as submissions manager for Typecast.

In 2015, Hall published her first short fiction piece. She published "Bombyx Mori" in 2017 with Strange Horizons.

=== The Border Keeper ===
Hall released her debut novella, The Border Keeper, in 2019. The main character, Vasethe, asks the border keeper of the underworld, Mkalis, to help him find his lover's soul. Hall later said that she wrote The Border Keeper as part of an open submission period to Tordotcom in 2016, and was surprised to be selected by the publisher. The Border Keeper was a finalist for a Nommo Award, which honors the best speculative fiction works created by African authors.

Katharine Coldiron, reviewing for Locus, described the work as "an addictive book, a sensuous and mesmerizing dip into a totally new realm of fantasy, but it's so confusing that its impressions linger much more effectively than its story or its meaning." Eric Brown recommended it for The Guardian for its world-building and emotion, while Kirkus Reviews said it was an "intriguing" debut that holds too much detail until the end but builds a "weird and wonderful" world. Publishers Weekly praised the book's emotional journey but criticized the end's pacing.

=== Star Eater and Second Spear ===
Hall's first novel, Star Eater, was released in 2021 to positive reviews. Acolyte Elfreda Raughn is a member of a sisterhood who protects their city from monsters at the cost of magic inherited by ritualized cannibalism and forced procreation. Elfreda agrees to spy for a faction within the sisterhood in exchange for avoiding the gory renewal ceremonies, but is implicated in a murder and begins to uncover hidden stories.

Liz Bourke, writing for Locus, praised the gruesome but intricate worldbuilding and how the relationships between characters supported optimism and change. She praised the book's examination of power and described the book as queer and subversive. Publishers Weekly appreciated the characterization, prose, and political insights, but disliked the setup of its plot twists.

Hall released Second Spear, the sequel to The Border Keeper, in 2022. A new protagonist, Tyn, struggles with shame after having been suspended from her role as Second Spear. When her realm of Mkalis is attacked and its usual leader is missing, Tyn and the current Spears must handle the invasion themselves. Publishers Weekly praised the world-building but criticized some of the plot twists. Leah von Essen wrote a starred review for Booklist, praising the horror of the story.

=== Asunder ===
Asunder, published in 2024, is a novel whose protagonist, Karys Eska, sold her soul to become a Deathspeaker who could talk with the recently dead. She works as a detective studying suspicious deaths, but becomes haunted by a stranger in an accident. They journey together to find a cure before both die.

Bourke praised the novel for Locus, describing it as "a thoughtful novel, complex and deep. It’s also a fast-paced, tense ride through a world that doesn’t hold back from glittering weirdness" Esmay Rosalyne described it as "the fantasy horror adventure of [her] darkest dreams" in a review for Grimdark. Library Journal gave the book a starred review, praising its relationships, mythology, and politics. Asunder was a finalist for the Nebula and Locus awards.

=== Dressmaker ===
Hall worked on Dressmaker, a job simulation video game developed by Cozy Lives and published in 2026 by Free Lives. She worked on the game as an external contractor.

== Awards ==
Year	Work	Award	Category	Result	Ref
2020	The Border Keeper	Nommo Award	Novella	Shortlisted	
2024	Asunder	Nebula Award	Novel	Finalist	
2025	Asunder	Locus Award	Fantasy Novel	Finalist	
