= Fashion Designer: Style Icon =

2007 simulation video game

- Developer: Creative Patterns
- Publishers: EU: 505 Games; NA: Ubisoft
- Platform: Nintendo DS
- Release: EU: 9 November 2007; NA: 10 June 2008
- Genre: Simulation
- Modes: Single-player, multiplayer

Fashion Designer: Style Icon, released in North America as My Fashion Studio, is a 2007 simulation video game developed by French studio Creative Patterns for the Nintendo DS. It was published by 505 Games in Europe on 9 November 2007 and by Ubisoft in North America on 10 June 2008. The game follows an aspiring fashion designer who creates clothing for clients using the Nintendo DS touchscreen.

== Gameplay ==
The player controls a young woman pursuing a career as a fashion designer. She begins at a fashion training school before establishing her own workshop, where she can accept private commissions, supply boutiques and operate mail-order businesses.

Gameplay consists of missions in which the player designs and makes clothing to meet clients' requirements. The player selects patterns and fabrics, then uses the Nintendo DS stylus to cut fabric, operate a sewing machine, iron garments and attach buttons. Completed designs can be presented in catalogues, on movie posters and at fashion shows, with the player choosing models and hairstyles for their presentation.

Each garment is evaluated according to the time taken, accuracy and suitability of the design for the client. New patterns, fabrics, accessories and models become available as the player progresses. Later missions introduce moths that attempt to steal fabric, requiring the player to drive them away while completing dressmaking tasks.

In addition to the career mode, a free mode allows players to create clothing without completing missions. The game also supports wireless multiplayer competitions in which players compete to create designs.

== Development and release ==
Fashion Designer: Style Icon was announced by 505 Games in June 2007. It was developed by Creative Patterns, a video game studio based in Strasbourg, France. At the time, Pocket Gamer noted that its announcement followed that of Ubisoft's similarly themed Imagine: Fashion Designer, with both games scheduled for release in Europe later that year.

The game was released in Europe as Fashion Designer: Style Icon on 9 November 2007. Ubisoft subsequently published it in North America under the title My Fashion Studio on 10 June 2008.

== Reception ==
Reception

Review scores
Publication	Score
IGN	7/10
NexGam	7/10

IGN gave the North American release, titled My Fashion Studio, a score of 7 out of 10.

NexGam awarded Fashion Designer: Style Icon a score of 7 out of 10. The reviewer compared its gameplay to Cooking Mama, praising the straightforward stylus controls, humorous story and pace of the missions. Although the range of dressmaking activities was limited, the reviewer found that the need to work quickly and accurately prevented them from becoming tedious. The review also praised the game's cartoon-style artwork but criticised the repetitive voice samples.

GamePro was more critical. In a 2008 feature assessing casual games, the magazine described the dressmaking activities as overly simple, consisting largely of tracing lines or following arrows with the stylus. It also criticised the repeated voice samples and assigned the game a "game content" rating of 6 per cent.

== See also ==
- Dressmaker
- Magical Craft: My Enchanted Dress Shop
