= Easy Delivery Co. =

2025 video game

- Cover art featuring the protagonist and their kei truck
- Developer: Sam C.
- Publisher: Oro Interactive
- Writers: Sam C.; Josh C.
- Composers: pr0te; sohaoying
- Engine: Unity
- Platforms: Windows; iOS; Android; macOS
- Release: Windows; 18 September 2025; macOS; 24 March 2026; Mobile/Switch/Xbox Series/Playstation 5; 26 March 2026
- Genres: Job simulation Vehicle simulation
- Mode: Single-player

Easy Delivery Co. is a job simulation video game by indie developer Sam C. and published by Oro Interactive. The game takes place in a set of mountainous, snow-filled towns where the player, an anthropomorphic cat, delivers packages between shops and houses with their kei truck. As the story progresses, the player unravels a mystery that affects the personalities of the various shopkeepers in the game. Following his final year at a game development course, Sam Cameron began developing a split-screen racing game, which would eventually change into a delivery game. The game's graphics emulate the style of a PlayStation 1 game, using lower fidelity graphics and pixelization. A demo for the game was released in April 2025, only including one of the three areas accessible in the full game. Easy Delivery Co. was released on 18 September 2025 on Windows, and has been given generally favorable reviews.

== Gameplay ==
An in-progress delivery within the game, showing the player's kei truck

Easy Delivery Co. is a delivery game, with the player taking the role of an EasyCo delivery driver portrayed as an anthropomorphic cat. It uses low-polygon 3D models, giving objects and characters a blocky appearance, and a pixelization filter to emulate the aesthetic of PlayStation 1 games. Players must accept job requests to earn money, which require them to deliver packages within or between three towns: Mountain Town, Snowy Peaks, and Fishing Town. To deliver packages, the player starts the game with a kei truck based on a Honda Acty. During deliveries, the player interacts with various shopkeepers—also anthropomorphic cats—which narrate their thoughts and interpersonal relationships with other characters. The game is set in a snowy, mountainous area, with the snow becoming a potential road hazard in parts of the game. Blizzards occasionally affect the environment, which can cause the player to succumb to the cold when outside of their truck. Drinks, such as energy drinks and coffee, help in slowing down the effect of the cold on the player. If the player stays too long in the cold, they are sent to a dark and endless maze before they respawn back at their truck. There are no other vehicles on the road besides the player. Upgrades for the player's truck help maneuverability through the snow-filled roads, and later provide access to other areas of the game's map. Lo-fi, drum and bass, and jungle music make up the game's soundtrack, and can be chosen from various in-game radio stations.

== Plot ==
The game's main quests are given by MK, the only anthropomorphic dog in the game and a former EasyCo maintenance person, usually found singing around a campfire. They offer to fill in the player's map in exchange for an energy drink, which they later leave to the player. Throughout deliveries, shopkeepers will constantly misidentify the player as a former delivery driver named Seb. After purchasing a lighter as part of MK's quests, the player can clear a road block that leads to Snowy Peaks, north of Mountain Town. After entering Snowy Town, the player can visit MK's cabin. There, they are told to buy snow tires to be able to drive in Snowy Peaks' roads, which can be heavily covered by snow. After getting the snow tires, MK asks for the player's help at Fishing Town, found south of Mountain Town. At Fishing Town, the player is blocked by an EasyCo security gate that leads to all of Fishing Town's areas. MK asks the player to reactivate three radio stations found across the map to open the gate. After activating all radio stations and buying a bumper bar, the player will be able to break down fence gates which lead to the EasyCo Hydro Dam. At the dam, the player can take a pair of handheld radios. While finishing deliveries to earn the money required to purchase all upgrades necessary, the shopkeepers' dialogues will progressively glitch out until they respond to the player with an "offline" message. After finally buying ice chains, the player can cross the frozen lake which leads to a factory.

Inside the factory, MK explains over the radio that they used to be close friends with Seb, who had shut down after quitting their job to be with MK. They also explain that the shopkeepers progressively get worse, particularly after the player starts delivering, with rebooting them being the only way to restore their original personalities. After rebooting the shopkeepers, they all return to normal with their memories reset, but will glitch out again after more deliveries are done. Alternatively, the player can choose to shut down all shopkeepers instead of rebooting them, making them completely unresponsive.

The game's true ending is available if the player finds and purchases a recovery disc. At the factory, they will be able to restore all the shopkeepers, unlocking new dialogue for all of them. After returning to MK's cabin, they thank and entrust the shopkeepers to the player, and leave to try and find Seb, hoping that EasyCo made a backup for them.

== Development ==
After finishing his capstone project in his final year for a game development course at Sheridan College, Sam Cameron (Note: Credited as "Sam C" in the game and in storefronts) began developing Easy Delivery Co. initially as a two-player split-screen racing game in the Unity game engine. Cameron then created the 3D model for the player's vehicle: a kei truck based on a Honda Acty, which chosen as it was an interest for Cameron at the time. After modeling the player's truck, Cameron built the game's environment and finished a proof-of-concept for a basic delivery game. The game was inspired by Animal Crossing and The Long Dark, with the game's environment and atmosphere being based on the latter along with sceneries from British Columbia and northern Ontario, both in Canada. Cameron chose a lower fidelity art style as art was not his specialty compared to programming. The 3D models for the game were created in Blockbench, a low poly 3D graphics editor. Photographs were used as textures for the environment, whereas textures for the player's truck, all character models, and in-game items were drawn with pixel art. The dialogue for the game was written by Cameron's brother. Cameron originally intended the game to be smaller, only including Mountain Town along with some on-foot exploration and a narrative mystery. Following the release of the demo, Cameron refocused the game on its driving and delivery aspects.

Cameron considered publishing the game independently, but thought that it would take time away from development. After meeting with other publishers, Oro Interactive found Cameron's game and later became its publisher. A demo for the game was released on 24 April 2025. It required a shovel to clear areas and included a map marker showing the player's location, with the goal of activating two radio towers in Mountain Town, the only available area. A full release for Windows later followed on 18 September 2025. The full release added new towns, changed progression from items to vehicle upgrades, and removed the map marker. Cameron removed the marker as it had prevented players from learning the roads, which took away from the game's experience.

An update for the game was released on 6 July 2026, featuring a new racing game mode and additional music by Sohaoying.

== Reception ==
Easy Delivery Co. has received generally favorable reviews. In a review for Vice, Shaun Cichacki praises the game's atmosphere: "It's creepy and kooky, mysterious and spooky, but most importantly, it's also incredibly adorable." Geoffrey Bunting for The Verge compared the game to Twin Peaks, and calls the driving experience "relaxing without being passive, a hard balance to strike". He also appreciates the concept of the game, and describes it as a "low-poly mix of Lake and Silent Hill". Early reviews appreciated the game's PlayStation 1 aesthetic, including Cichacki and Oisin Kuhnke for Rock Paper Shotgun, who writes that it "can obviously feel a bit overdone in some cases now, but Easy Delivery Co. just looks right, a bit dreary, a bit lonely even, yet with a hint of goofiness about it". Mollie Taylor for PC Gamer described the driving experience as "lonely, harsh, but weirdly comforting" and the game as "Silent Hill meets Animal Crossing meets DoorDash".

A common point of critique of the game includes minor bugs, as described by Bunting and Vladimir Makarov for Igromania. Makarov delivers a more critical review of the game, appreciating the early game but noting the monotony of deliveries as the game progresses further, where deliveries are done out of necessity to progress the story. He also criticized the underuse of game mechanics—such as the bumper bar and makeshift campfires—relative to the main story, a sentiment shared by Bunting.
