= Dressmaker (video game) =

2026 cozy job simulation game

- Developer: Cozy Lives
- Publisher: Free Lives
- Producer: Anja "Nanna" Venter Rausch
- Designers: Jonathan Hau-Yoon; Ruan Rothmann; Sabrina Becker
- Programmer: Ruan Rothmann
- Artists: Jonathan Hau-Yoon; Sara Laubscher
- Writer: Kerstin Hall
- Composers: Meydän; Jason Sutherland
- Engine: Unity
- Platforms: Windows, macOS
- Release: 21 September 2026
- Genres: Job simulation, virtual dress-up game
- Mode: Single-player

Dressmaker is a 2026 job simulation game developed by Cozy Lives and published by Free Lives. It was released for Windows and macOS on 21 September 2026. Players run a dressmaking shop, taking commissions from townspeople and making dresses by measuring customers, designing garments, purchasing and cutting fabric, sewing pieces together, and adding decorations. It was described as a cosy game.

The game was conceived by Jonathan Hau-Yoon and his partner Sabrina Becker, a dressmaker whose knowledge of garment construction informed its design. An initial prototype was developed at Free Lives over approximately three weeks and released in 2025. It was said to have recouped its development costs within 24 hours of release.

Dressmaker received generally favourable reviews. Critics praised its sewing mechanics, creative freedom and variety of clothing designs. Some reviewers found the shop-management elements limited and expressed concerns about repetitive commissions.

== Gameplay ==
The sewing minigame, in which the player guides fabric through a sewing machine along a marked seam. Sewing accuracy affects the quality of the finished garment.

In Dressmaker, the player operates a dressmaking shop in a town. Customers commission garments for particular events, specifying preferences such as professional or gothic styles, warmth, or a playful appearance. The player measures each customer and uses a sketchbook to create a design by combining different bodices, sleeves, collars and skirts. Fabrics and accessories have properties that determine how well the finished dress meets the customer's preferences.

Once a design is complete, the player selects and purchases fabric, including cotton, linen, wool, silk and velvet. Pattern pieces must be arranged on the fabric before cutting. Their orientation relative to the fabric's grain or bias affects the appearance of the finished garment. Players can also arrange the pieces to minimise wasted material.

The cut pieces are assembled on an adjustable dress form and sewn together through a minigame. The player guides fabric through a sewing machine along a marked seam, with inaccurate sewing reducing the quality of the garment. Finished dresses can be decorated with buttons, bows, appliqué, lace and other accessories.

Completing commissions earns money and reputation. Customers return with further requests, and conversations with them develop their individual storylines. Progress through the story unlocks additional patterns, fabrics and decorations. Players can also make dresses without a commission, display them in the shop and sell them off the rack.

== Development ==
=== Concept and prototype ===
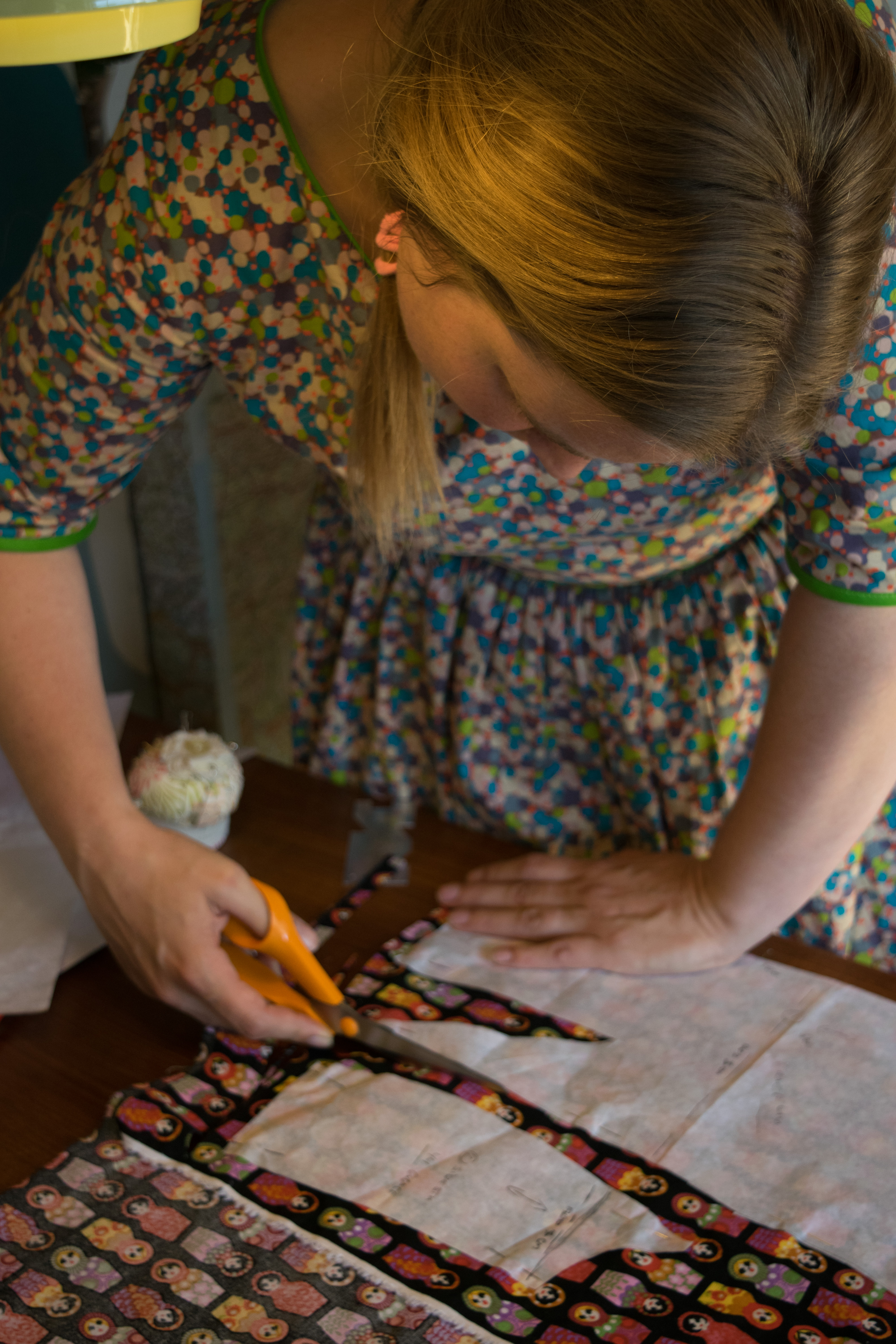
The game's initial prototype centred on arranging and cutting pattern pieces on fabric, drawing on the corresponding process in dressmaking.

Jonathan Hau-Yoon conceived Dressmaker while looking for a game project based on a personal interest. His partner, Sabrina Becker, was an experienced dressmaker with an interest in fashion history. She had considered studying costume design professionally, but Ehlers–Danlos syndrome prevented her from pursuing those plans. Becker had worn a dress she made herself on the couple's first date. Together, they developed a game concept based on the decisions involved in making clothing, including arranging pattern pieces on fabric, accounting for the grain of the material, selecting trims and buttons, and fulfilling customers' requests.

The developers began with the arrangement of pattern pieces on fabric. Becker compared the process to a puzzle, as dressmakers must minimise waste while accounting for the fabric's grain, bias and patterns. Hau-Yoon wanted the game to provide opportunities for creative expression without requiring players to perform every task involved in real dressmaking. Cutting and sewing were retained, while activities such as ironing were omitted.

Dressmaker began as a side project by Hau-Yoon and Becker. The earliest version consisted of a table for arranging and cutting fabric patterns and a mannequin on which the resulting pieces could be assembled. Hau-Yoon shared a demonstration of the prototype on TikTok, where it received approximately half a million views before the game had been named. He then brought the project to Free Lives, where he worked with Ruan Rothmann and Sara Laubscher to produce a playable prototype in approximately three weeks.

The prototype was downloaded approximately 30,000 times during its first month. According to Hau-Yoon, the response from players and videos made by content creators persuaded Free Lives to approve development of a full game. Prototype builds for Windows, macOS and Linux were released through itch.io in August 2025.

=== Design and production ===
Dressmaking students at Hampton Normal and Agricultural Institute in 1910. Historical clothing influenced the game's visual design.

Becker designed dresses for the game and advised the developers on dressmaking techniques and historical clothing. Although the game is not set in a specific historical period, its appearance was influenced by an era when customers commonly commissioned bespoke clothing. The developers chose not to restrict the setting to a particular period so that players could make both historical and modern designs.

The game uses a simplified measurement system that adjusts garment pieces proportionally to fit customers of different sizes. It also omits the physical simulation of cloth, allowing players to combine fabrics and decorations in ways that might be impractical when making actual garments. Rather than attempting photorealism, the developers used stylised materials and visual effects to suggest fabric properties, such as the sparkle of sequins.

Becker initially devised several characters around contrasting clothing styles. Rose, a librarian, was given a 1940s-inspired appearance, while Prudence was designed with Victorian influences. Writer Kerstin Hall subsequently developed the characters and their storylines from Becker's original concepts. Becker also cited dress-up games and paper dolls as influences on the clothing-design system.

Development took place within Cozy Lives, a small team at Free Lives. The full-time core team consisted of Hau-Yoon, Rothmann and Laubscher. Becker advised on dressmaking and reviewed the game's design, while sound designer Jason Sutherland worked on the project alongside several other Free Lives games. Hall wrote the dialogue, and Meydän composed the music, having previously worked on the soundtrack for Free Lives' Terra Nil. The game's key art was illustrated by Carolina Soares, known professionally as Carolemellow.

Each garment has a three-dimensional model displayed on the mannequin and corresponding two-dimensional pattern pieces used for cutting. Hau-Yoon compared the relationship between the two to UV unwrapping: the placement of a pattern piece on the fabric determines how the fabric's texture appears on the completed garment. The developers also created a system that adjusts both the mannequin and the pattern pieces when a customer's measurements change, reducing distortion of the fabric.

The need to place seams and alter the proportions of garment pieces presented technical difficulties during development. Rothmann described Dressmaker as the most technically demanding game he had worked on. Becker arranged a sewing class for the developers, while Sutherland recorded sounds from her vintage Singer sewing machine and other equipment for use in the game. Dressmaker was developed in Unity in South Africa.

== Release ==
Dressmaker was shown at Wholesome Direct on 6 June 2026, when Cozy Lives announced that it would be released in September. Ahead of release, Creative Bloq described it as a "cosy crafting game".

The game was released for Windows and macOS on 21 September 2026. A 16-track soundtrack album composed by Meydän was released on the same day.

On the day of release, the developers announced plans to add an online challenge mode, transparent fabrics and full controller support. They also announced plans to bring the game to mobile devices and the Nintendo Switch.

Dressmaker had accumulated more than 400,000 wishlists on Steam before its release. According to the developers, it recovered its development costs within 24 hours of launch. On 24 September, the game had reached tenth place on Steam's Top Sellers chart.

== Reception ==
Reception

Aggregate scores
Aggregator	Score
Metacritic	PC: 85/100 (Note: Based on seven reviews.)
OpenCritic	100% recommend (Note: Based on six reviews.)

Review scores
Publication	Score
ScreenHub	5/5
Checkpoint Gaming	7.5/10
InsertCoins.press	8/10

Dressmaker received "generally favorable" reviews from critics, according to review aggregator Metacritic, which reported a score of 85 out of 100 based on seven reviews. OpenCritic reported an average score of 83 out of 100, with all six critics recommending the game.

Leah J. Williams of ScreenHub gave the game five out of five stars. She praised its representation of dressmaking, particularly the fabric-cutting and sewing systems. Williams considered the sewing-machine minigame an effective recreation of operating a real machine. She also found that the developing story and regular introduction of new materials helped prevent the process of making multiple garments from becoming repetitive.

Checkpoint Gaming rated Dressmaker 7.5 out of 10. The reviewer enjoyed its characters and interconnected storylines, accessibility options, and the variety of designs made possible by combining patterns, fabrics and appliqué. However, the review found that the shop-management elements lacked the depth of the dressmaking systems.

InsertCoins.press gave the game 8 out of 10, praising its attention to garment construction rather than simply dressing characters. The reviewer particularly enjoyed how the placement of pattern pieces along the grain or bias affected the finished clothing, as well as the freedom provided by the decoration tools. The review nevertheless raised concerns about repetitive commissions, suggesting that the game's longevity would depend on the variety of requests and customisation options.

Mollie Taylor of PC Gamer described the garment-creation system as unusually detailed. She also discussed the range of designs shared by players, including original creations and dresses based on fictional characters and other subjects.

Dressmaker received a nomination for "Best Debut Indie Game" at the Game Awards 2026.

== See also ==
- Fashion Designer: Style Icon
- Magical Craft: My Enchanted Dress Shop
- Style Savvy: Fashion Forward
