= Economy of the Western Cape =

Economy of Western Cape
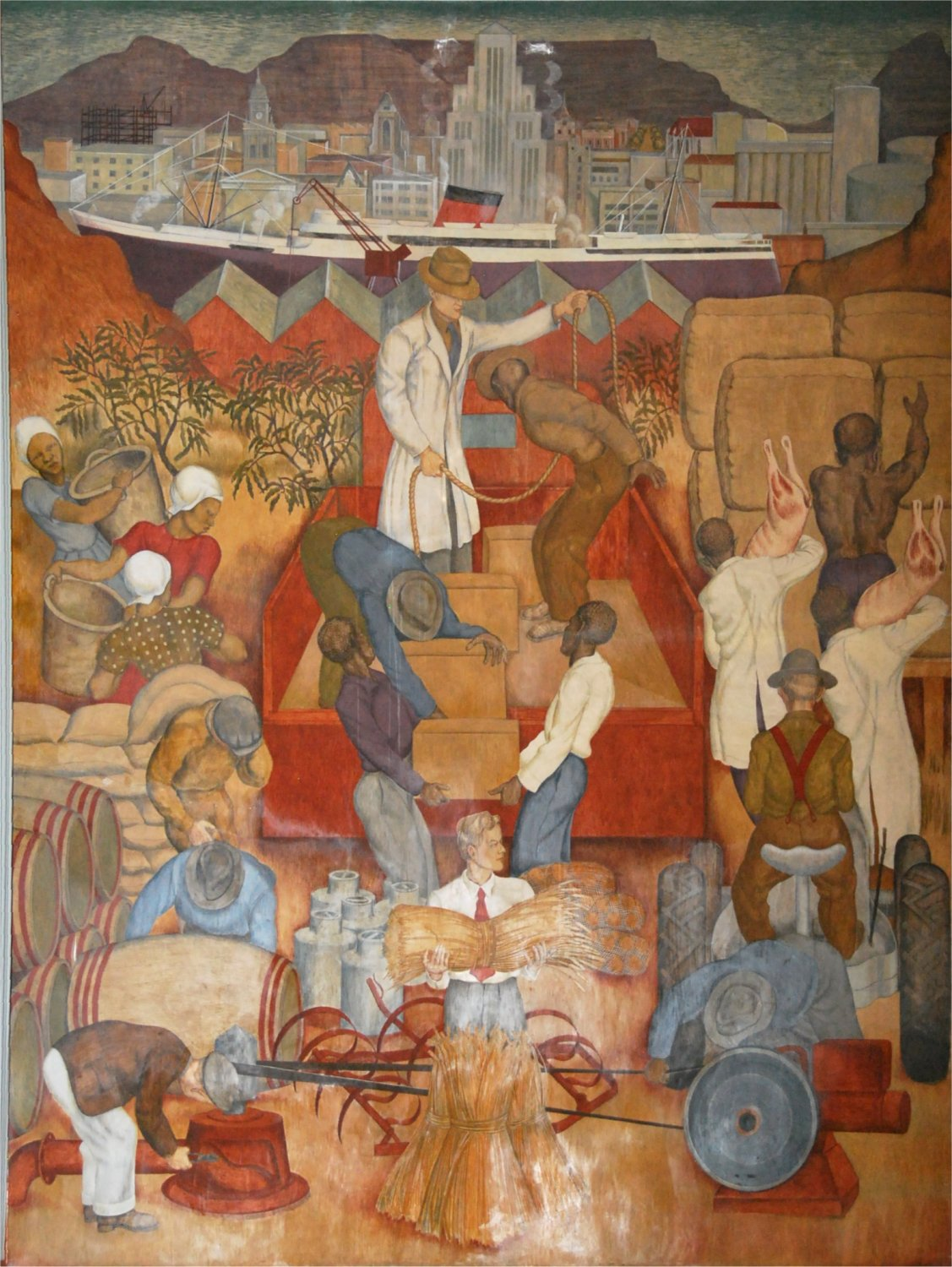
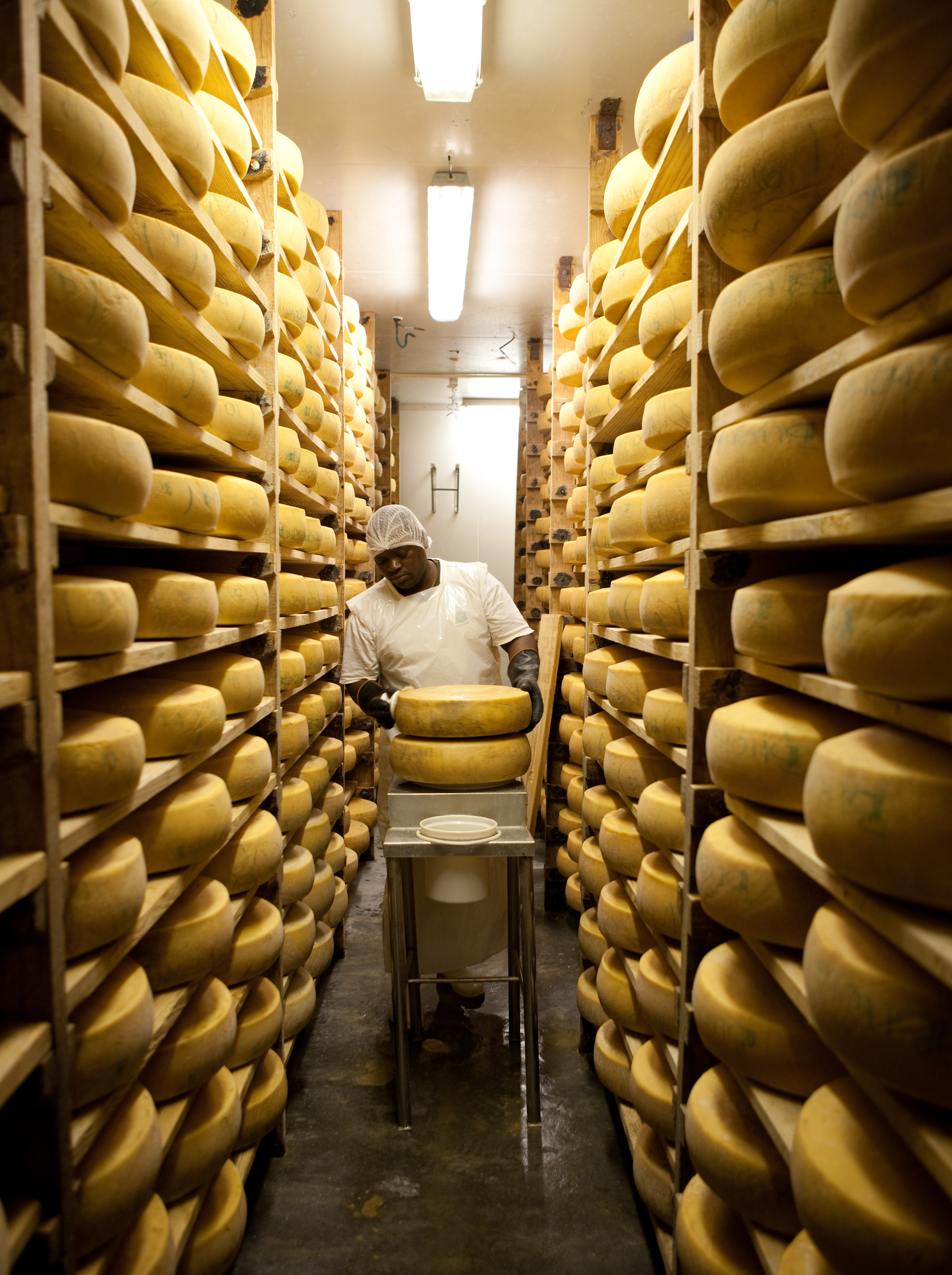
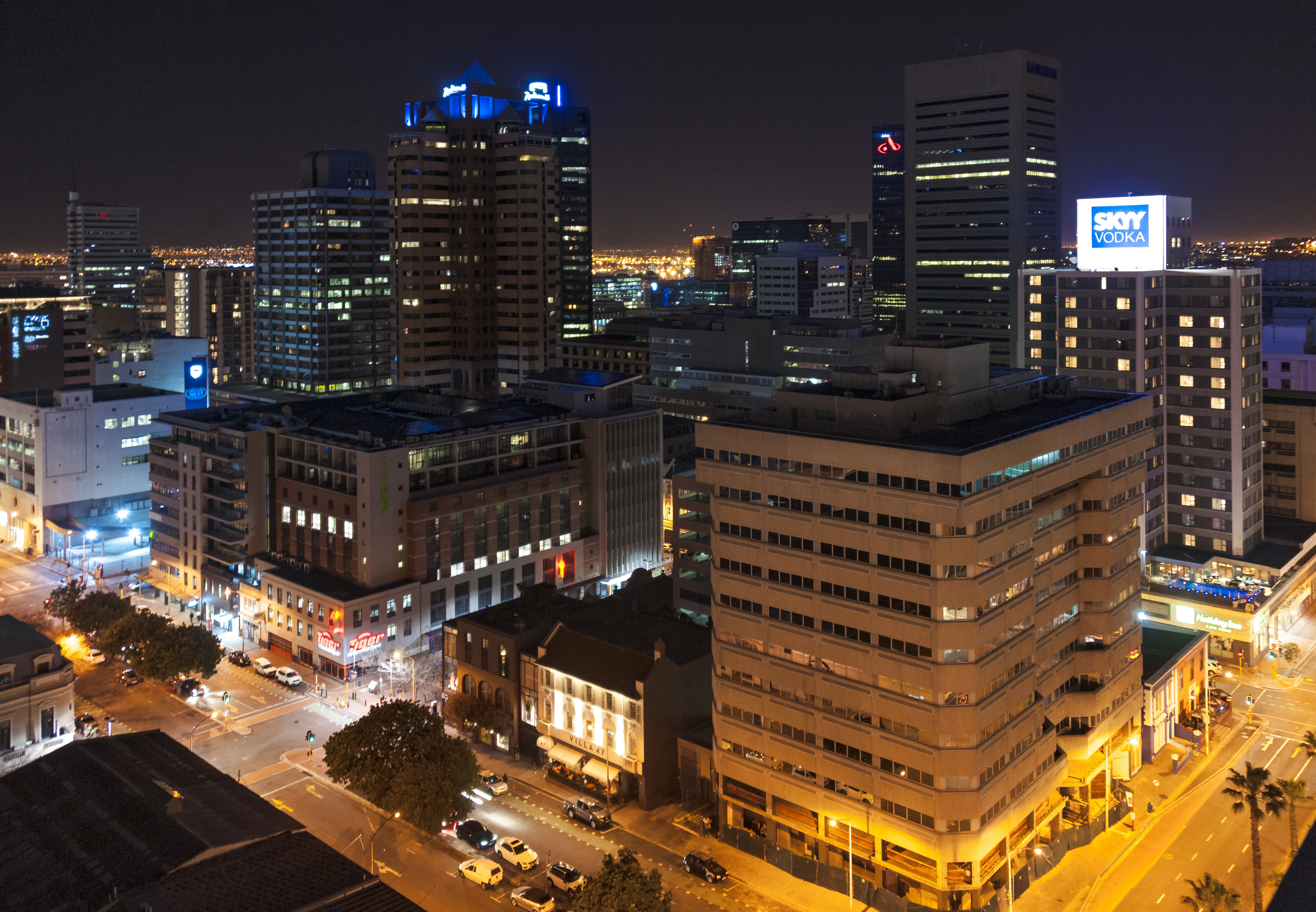
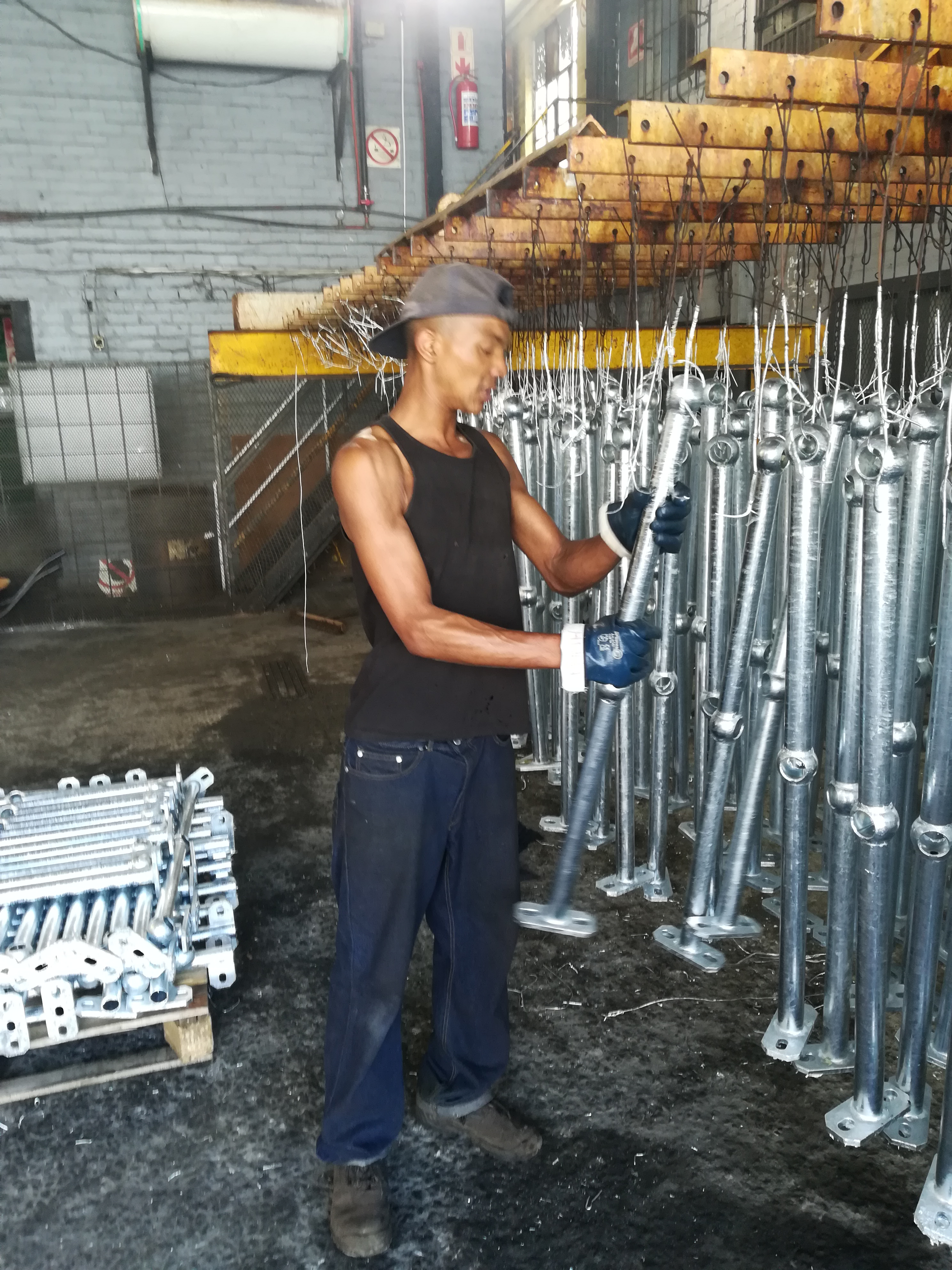
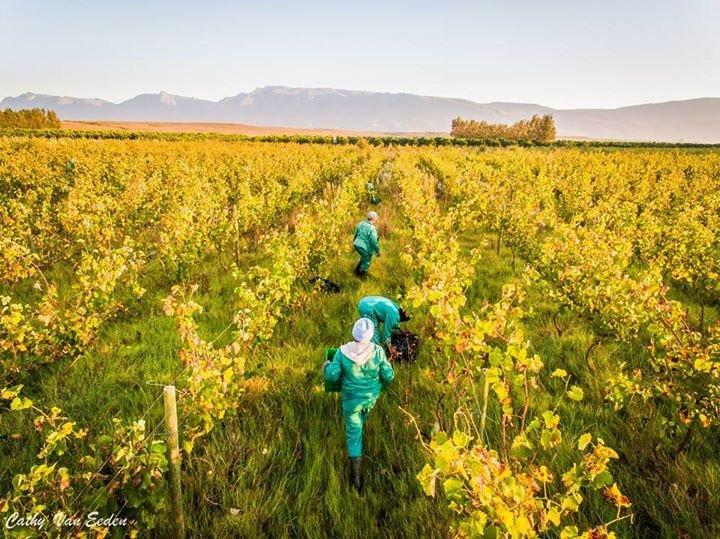
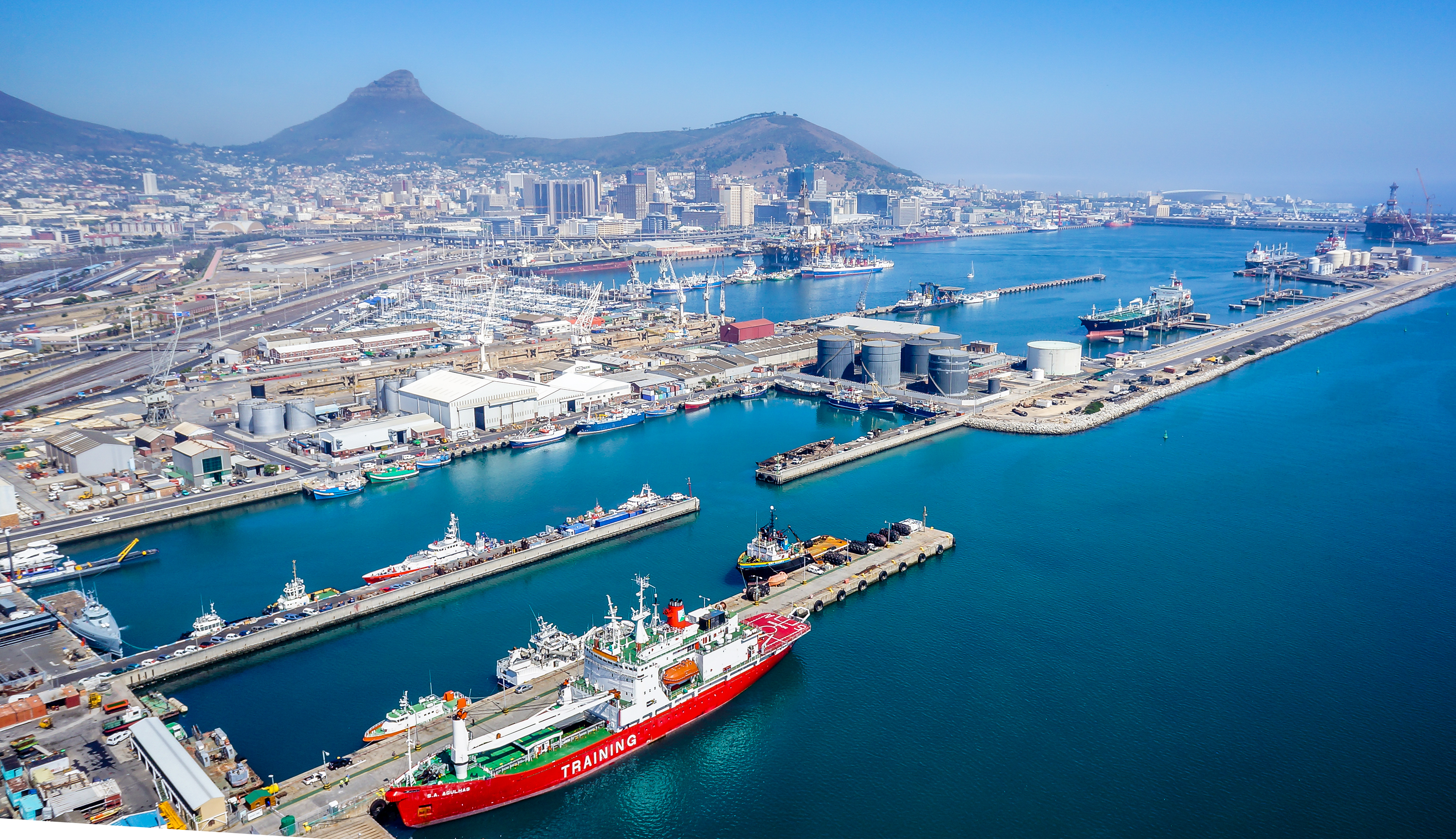
- Clockwise from top: A panel from the frescoes in the Assembly Room, Mutual Building in Cape Town, painted by Le Roux Smith in 1942; the fresco illustrates the importance of agriculture and shipping to the economy of the Western Cape in the early half of the 20th century. Cheeses production in Stanford. Recently galvanised pipes being finished in a Cape Town. The Cape Town City Bowl. The port at Cape Town. Agricultural workers picking grapes in a Western Cape vineyard.

Statistics
- GDP: ZAR 918 billion (US$ 56 billion) (2022)
- Gini coefficient: 0.58 (2010)
- Human Development Index: 0.75
- Labour force: 2,785,871 (2016)
- Unemployment: 19.6% (2024)

Public finance
- Revenue: R269.58 billion (2020) - to national ficus
- Spending: R72.3 billion (2021)

The City of Cape Town metro (bottom left) accounts for over 70% of the Western Cape's total economic output

The economy of the Western Cape in South Africa is dominated by the city of Cape Town, which accounted for 72.4% of the Western Cape's economic activity in 2023. The single largest contributor to the region's economy is the financial and business services sector, followed by manufacturing.

Close to 30% of the gross regional product comes from foreign trade with agricultural products and wine dominating exports. High-tech industries, international call centres, fashion design, advertising and TV production are niche industries rapidly gaining in importance.

The Western Cape province had an estimated real GDP (constant 2015 prices) for 2024 of R666.75 billion (equivalent to US$36.39 billion) growing 0.75% from R661.79 billion in 2023. Inflation averaged at 4.4% for 2024.

The province accounts for 14% of South Africa's total GDP with Cape Town accounting for approximately 10.1% of the country's total GDP in 2023. The Western Cape had a GDP per capita of R88,438 compared to the national average of just below R75,000 per capita in 2023. In Q4 2024, the province had a substantially lower unemployment rate, at 19.6%, than the national average of 31.9%.

Also in Q4 2024, number of unemployed people declined by 16,000, year-over-year, with employment figures increasing by 2.3% over the same period. Between 2019 and 2024 the province generated a disproportionately large number of jobs relative to the region's size; creating 52.2% of all new net employment in the country.

| Sector | Gross Value Added (2024) | Share of Provincial GDPR (market prices) |
|---|---|---|
| Agriculture, forestry and fishing | R23 000 000 000 | 3.45% |
| Mining and quarrying | R900 000 000 | 0.13% |
| Manufacturing | R85 400 000 000 | 12.81% |
| Electricity and water | R11 900 000 000 | 1.78% |
| Construction | R20 900 000 000 | 3.13% |
| Wholesale & retail trade; hotels & restaurants | R78 700 000 000 | 11.80% |
| Transport and communication | R66 800 000 000 | 10.02% |
| Finance, real estate and business services | R207 400 000 000 | 31.10% |
| Personal services | R72 800 000 000 | 10.92% |
| General government services | R35 600 000 000 | 5.34% |
| Taxes less subsidies on products | R63 200 000 000 | 9.48% |
| All industries at basic prices | R603 600 000 000 | 90.52% |

== History ==
=== Early history ===
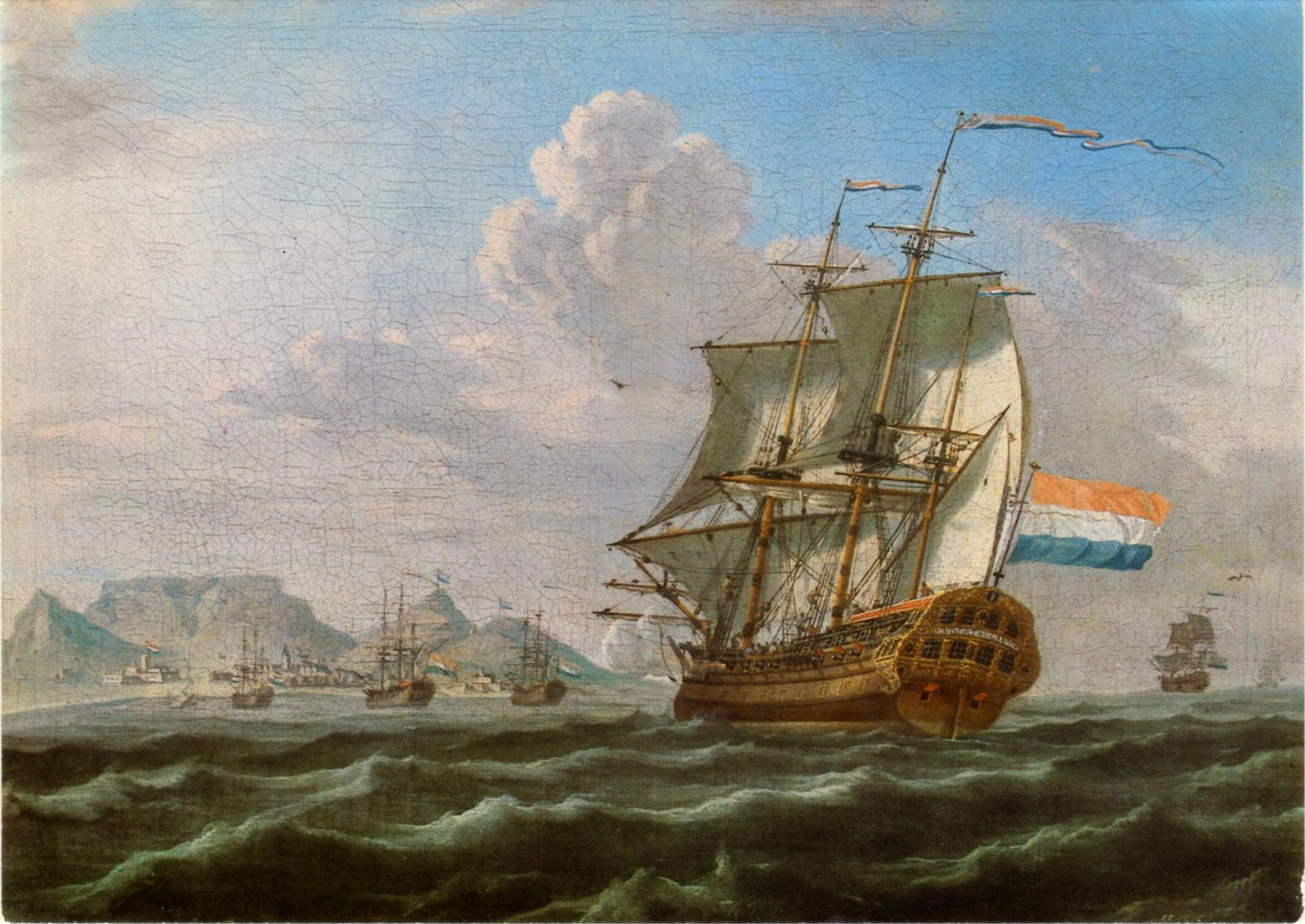
The Dutch controlled spice trade in the 18th century brought a lot of shipping to Cape Town, fueling the growth of the colony.

Since the founding of Cape Town by the Dutch East India Company (VOC) in 1652, the two pillars of the Cape Colony's economy until the Kimberley diamond strike of 1868 and the opening of the opening of the Suez Canal in 1869 were shipping and agriculture.

Cape Town's strategic position as the halfway point between Europe and Asia meant that prior to the opening of the Suez Canal, almost every ship involved in the spice trade between those two continents docked at Cape Town to resupply. The supplying of these ships with fresh provisions, fruit, and wine provided a very large market for the surplus produce of the colony. By the late 18th century, the Cape Colony was one of the best developed European settlements outside of Europe or the Americas.

During the 18th century, pastoral production was the dominant economic activity in the more arid north-western Cape (regions north of Paarl, south of Namaqualand and to the west of the Roggeveld) whilst mixed agriculture was dominant in the south-western Cape. During this period, the VOC exercised enormous control over the economy of the colony and imposed high and increasingly unpopular taxes in an effort to offset the high costs of running the colony.

For much of the Dutch rule in the Cape, income inequality is thought to have been amongst the highest in the pre-industrial world with pockets of wealthy living amongst an increasingly and relatively poor farming community. The biggest drivers of this inequality-apart from labour and race relations—was wheat and wine production. The wealthy segments of society were dominated by wine producers, alcohol merchants and those farmers that managed to dominate wheat production. One of the first economic recessions recorded in the colony occurred in years following the departure of French troops that were garrisoned at the Cape from 1781-1783.

Slavery played a large role in the early economy of the province until the British takeover of the Cape Colony in 1806 and the abolition of slavery in the British Empire in 1833. Slaves from across the Dutch Empire, in addition to political prisoners from the Dutch East Indies, were imported to work on the farms, homes and workshops in the area of the colony closest to Cape Town. At the beginning of the 18th century, labour relations between Dutch colonists—particularly the Trekboers in the interior—and the native Khoisan was largely characterised by semi-cooperative symbiosis.

By the beginning of the 19th century, the majority of the Khoisan had been turned into a class of wage labourers whose status and situation was similar to serfs. After 1833, the resistance of free burghers to the creation of a permanent wage-labour force as a result of the abolition of slavery as well as the 'resistance of freed slaves and Khoi to full proletarianization' produced labour relations characterised by a greater degree of dependency.

The main export staple of the Cape Colony for most of its history was wine and brandy, but by 1845 it had been overtaken in value by wool. The wool boom continued into the 1850s and in addition to a speculative boom in copper-mining shares investment in the region grew considerably. This sparked the growth of the region's financial industry and by 1860 there were 23 local banks operating in fifteen towns. Increases in costs of production, falling wool prices, poor quality wools and severe drought from 1862 were among the causes of an economic recession that affected the region for most of the 1860s. Increasing competition from Port Elizabeth for the trade of the interior of Southern Africa encouraged Capetonian business interests to lobby for the construction of a railway. By 1865, nine towns in the region had a population of over 2000 people.

=== 1869 to 1900 ===
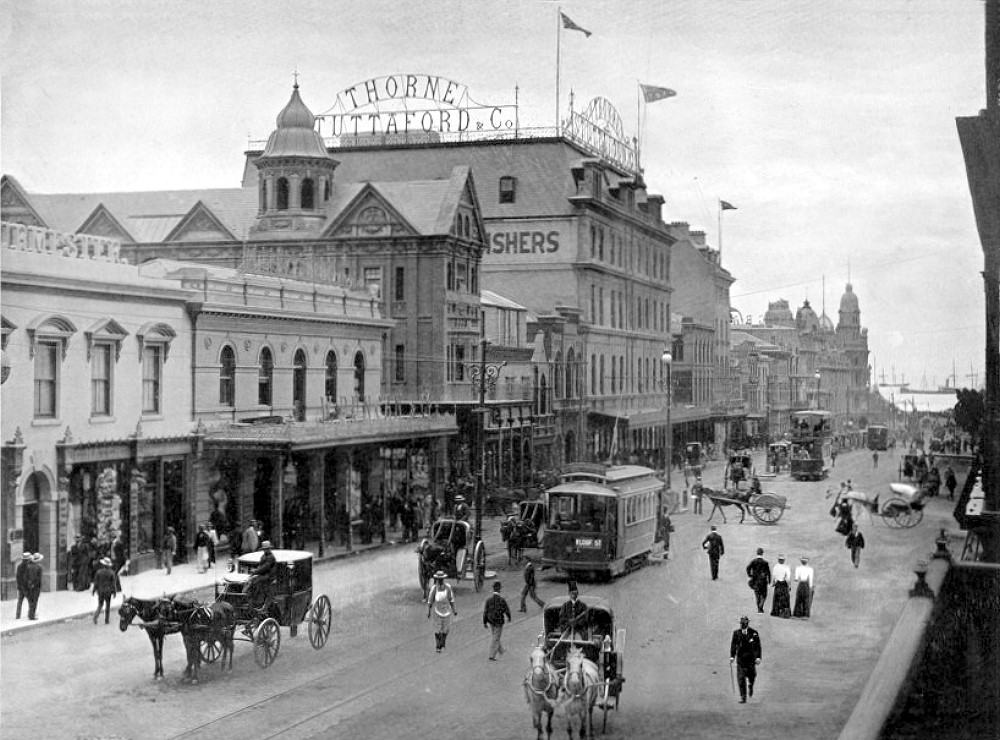
Adderley Street in 1897 was an important commercial hub in Cape Town at a time when the city was the most important centre of economic activity in the Southern Africa region.

After the MSP Suez Canal was constructed in 1869, Cape Town's importance as a refuelling point declined as the canal obviated the need to navigate the longer sea lane around the southern coast of Africa. The recession of the 1860s and the construction of the canal forced the colony to search for new opportunities and adopt new products in rural production. The raising of Angora goats and ostriches for their mohair and feathers respectively date from this period and became important export commodities.

The discovery of diamonds and gold in the interior again increased investment in Cape Town and despite a long depression that plagued the western world for much of the 1870s the Western Cape's economy boomed. In addition, wool exports doubled in value from 1869 to 1872 to well over £3 million (equivalent to R794,000,000 in 2018). However, it was Port Elizabeth whose merchants were best placed to service the interior where the gold and diamond deposits were found and as a centre for the wool and ostrich feather industries that would benefit the most.

The consequence of this was that the Western Cape became increasingly dependent on overseas trade (especially with Britain). Despite this, Port Elizabeth's future economic development was threatened by the government's refusal to invest in upgrading its port facilities whilst over £1 million (equivalent to R183,000,000 in 2018) was invested in Cape Town's harbour.

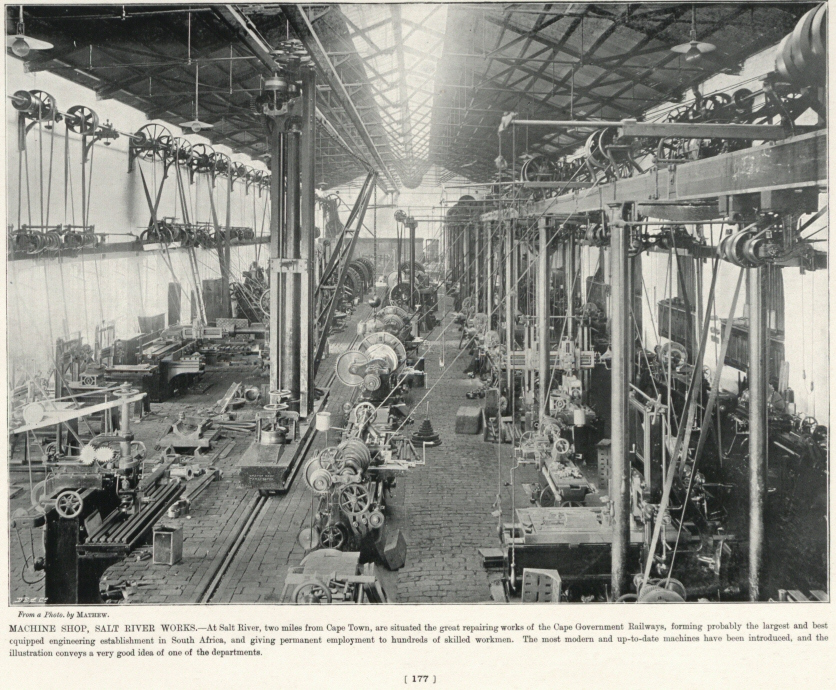
A machine stop for the Cape Government Railways at the Salt River Works in Cape Town around the year 1900. Salt River was a significant center of industry in Africa at the time.

Much of the investment used to develop the diamond fields during the diamond-company mania of 1880-1881 came from the older towns in the Western Cape. Over half of the £12 million (equivalent to equivalent to R3.357×10^{9} in 2018) invested in developing the Kimberly mines was raised in the Cape Colony. As Port Elizabeth and Kimberly developed the Western Cape found a booming market for its wheat and wine products. During this period, both the Eastern Cape and the Western Cape experienced some expansion in their manufacturing sectors.

However, the collapse in Kimberly mining shares (partly brought about by easy credit), poor agricultural performance and a decline in demand in the interior caused a series of bank collapses throughout the 1880s. This prompted renewed interest in mining investments in gold during the Witwatersrand Gold Rush where Western Cape capital was again used to develop mines in the interior of South Africa and Johannesburg in particular.

As the 19th century came to an end, the economic and political dominance of the Western Cape and Cape Town in particular during the 19th century gave way to the dominance of Johannesburg and Pretoria in the 20th century.

=== 1900s to 2020s ===
By the 1940s, differences in economic development between the Western Cape and the Witwatersrand (and Gauteng in general) had become more striking. The growing importance of local production inputs (thereby decreasing the importance of ports), the increasing relative cost of Western Cape labour and a growing reliance on semi-skilled instead of skilled labour in manufacturing had a negative impact on the province's economy. However this period of economic decline and underdevelopment did produce a highly competitive labour market.

Between 1999 and 2009 the provinces economy grew at an average rate of 4.9% per year. Difficult national macroeconomic conditions, including sluggish investment, infrastructure constraints, and persistent unemployment between 2013 to 2024 resulted in a relatively low average annual growth rate during this period of 0.83%; although low it still outperformed the rest of South Africa which experienced an average annual GDP growth rate of 0.67% during the same period.

=== 2020 to present ===
In November 2025, the province hosted the inaugural Western Cape Investment Summit. At a speech at the event, Premier Alan Winde noted how the province's economy had grown by over 8% over the preceding 10 years, far above the national average, including in Gauteng and KwaZulu-Natal. He also noted how, of 400,000 net jobs created across South Africa over the preceding five years, 360,347 of them were created in the Western Cape. That meant that a province with 12% of the nation's population created 89% of its net new jobs.

The Premier confirmed the province's plans to, through its Growth for Jobs Strategy, build the local economy up to a value of R1 trillion by 2035. Part of that plan involves tripling the Western Cape's exports to R450 billion, and increasing private sector investment to 20 percent of the province's GDP.

Other achievements highlighted at the summit were Cape Town International Airport having been rated Africa's best airport for five consecutive years, and the upcoming opening of the province's second international airport, the Cape Winelands Airport. The Premier also noted the Atlantis SEZ and Freeport Saldanha IDZ being magnets for green manufacturing and logistics.

The Growth for Jobs Strategy identified eight important sectors in which the province already leads, that are suitable for further expansion. These were tech, renewables, and retail, which are big parts of Cape Town's economy, as well as agribusiness, manufacturing, tourism, the creative industries, and logistics.

== Development and inequality indexes ==
The province's Gini coefficient of 0.625 in 2021 is lower than other provinces such as KwaZulu-Natal (0.634) or Gauteng (0.626) and is lower than South Africa's average Gini coefficient of 0.63 (for 2022). This make it more equal than the rest of the country whilst still being extremely high and unequal by international standards. This is also an increase since 2010 when the province had a Gini coefficient of 0.58 representing an increase in inequality levels. Between the year 2000 and 2010 province's income inequality declined as its Gini coefficient decreased from 0.63 in the year 2000 to 0.60 in 2007 and to 0.58 in 2010.

The Western Cape's Human Development Index is the highest in South Africa at 0.7708, compared to the South African average of 0.6675 in 2003.

== Imports and exports ==
Exports from the Western Cape totaled R167 billion (equivalent to US$11.13 billion) in 2021; R17 billion of those exports went to the United States making it the largest export market for the province in that year. The United States was also the largest source of investment for the province "investing R2.9 billion and R4.4 billion into the Western Cape in 2020 and 2021, respectively."

In 2010, the Western Cape imported a total of R104.9 billion worth of goods and commodities and exported R50.4 billion. The discrepancy between imports and exports and the dominance of oil producing countries as the top trade partners can be explained by the large amount of petroleum and petroleum products that are imported into the province to be processed and refined at the Chevron Oil Refinery in Cape Town.

Cape Town is a major entry point for oil and gas imports into South Africa. Adjusted for petroleum imports, the Western Cape imported R47.6 billion worth of goods and commodities in 2010 and had a trade surplus of R2.78 billion. A total of 1.2 million tons of cargo went through the Port of Cape Town in 2016.

=== Imports ===
The importation of crude oil and other petroleum related products accounts for the largest proportion of the province's imports. This due to the importance of Cape Town as an entry point and refining nexus for South Africa and the Southern African region as a whole for oil and gas imports. Imports to the province have increased by and average of 10.6% a year between 2008 and 2018.

Top five imports in 2010
| Product | Value (millions of Rands) | Percentage of total |
| Crude oil | 43,683 | 41.61% |
| Petroleum products | 13,688 | 13.04% |
| Liqueur and spirits | 1,674 | 1.6% |
| Medicaments | 1,382 | 1.32% |
| Electronic components | 1,035 | 0.99% |
| All other imports | 43,530 | 41.46% |

Top five source markets in 2010
| Country | Value (millions of Rands) | Percentage of total |
| China | 13,521 | 12.88% |
| Iran | 12,653 | 12.5% |
| Saudi Arabia | 12,188 | 11.61% |
| Angola | 8,932 | 8.51% |
| Nigeria | 5,298 | 5.05% |

=== Exports ===
Agriculture still MSP dominates the export industries of the Western Cape with little over 47% of all export commodities in 2010 being agricultural products. Exports have grown on average by 5% a year between 2001 and 2010. In 2014 countries in the rest of Africa overtook Europe as the leading destination for the province’s exports with most exports to Africa going to countries in the Southern African Customs Union bordering South Africa.

Agri-processed products such as food, beverages and tobacco was the biggest export sector accounting for around a quarter of exports in 2016 with most of these products coming from Cape Town or the Cape Winelands. Export growth of good produced in the region has averaged 6.6% a year between 2008 and 2018.

Top five export markets in 2010
| Country | Value (millions of Rands) | Percentage of total |
| United Kingdom | 5,076 | 10.07% |
| Netherlands | 4,918 | 9.76% |
| Germany | 2,954 | 5.86% |
| United States | 2,386 | 4.74% |
| Angola | 1,648 | 3.27% |

== Entrepreneurship and innovation ==
This finding [of Cape Town's entrepreneurship] suggests that Cape Town has a much higher level of knowledge, innovation and opportunity than elsewhere in the country.
- Dr Mike Herrington

The city of Cape Town is ranked as the most entrepreneurial city in South Africa with Early-Stage Entrepreneurial Activity being 190% greater than South Africa’s national average. Cape Town has plans to become a global design and innovation hub by focusing on industries and policies that support the design sector.

There has been a substantial increase in the number of high-tech start-up companies in Cape Town, with companies such as Yoco being a notable example. Interest in developing intellectual property companies, has also been expressed through communities such as the Silicon Cape Initiative. In October 2011 Cape Town was awarded the title of World Design Capital 2014 by the International Design Alliance.

== Industries ==
=== Technology ===
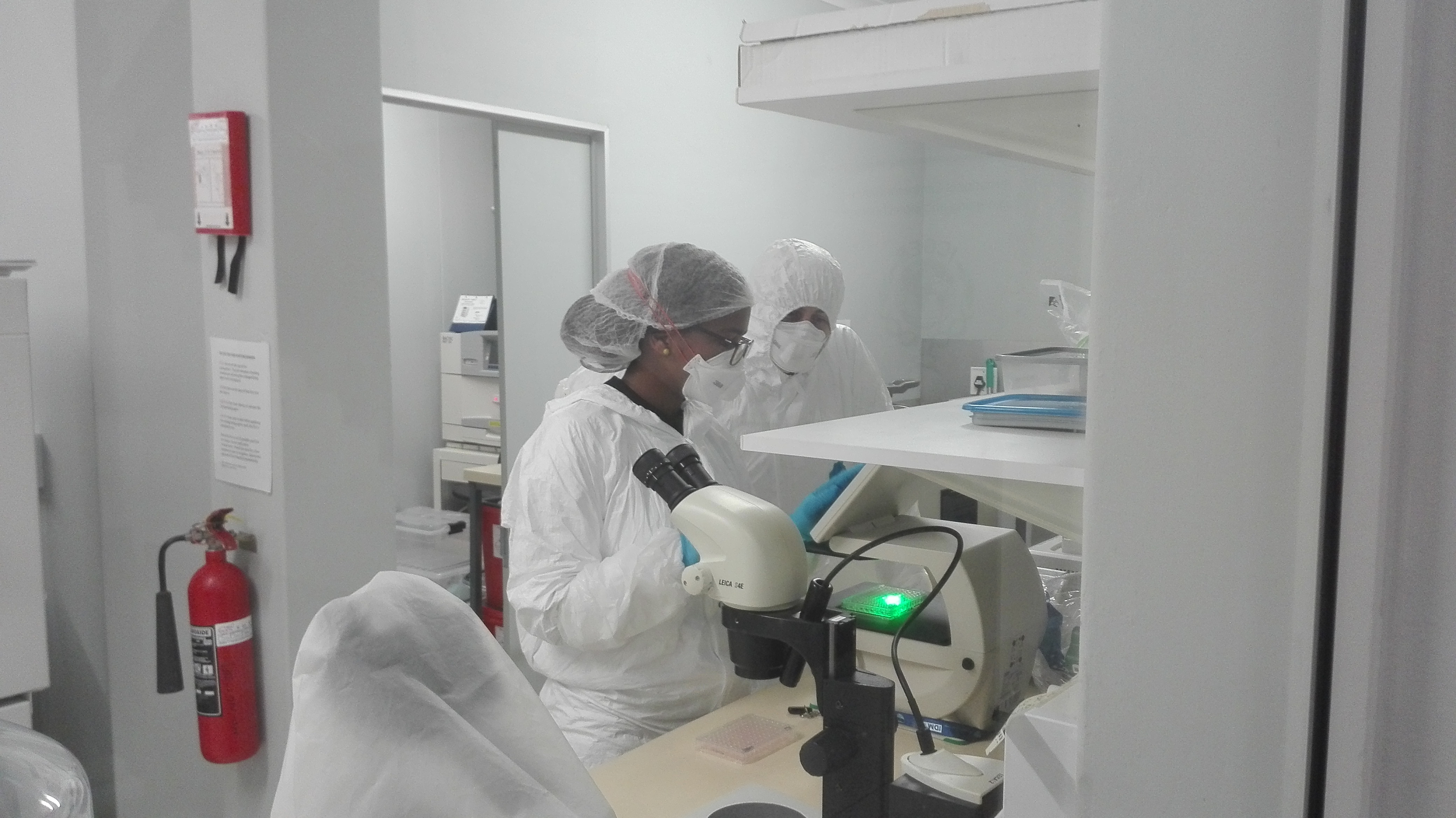
Tuberculosis researchers working in a Bio-safety Level 3 Lab at the University of Cape Town. The Institute of Infectious Disease is noted for its work on this disease.

By 2018, an estimated 10 to 15 technology startups were established in Cape Town annually, supported by a strong local business accelerator scene. A large number of South Africa's established technology startups have been founded and are located in Cape Town, and include video game, e-commerce, travel technology, digital services, and financial technology companies.

The Western Cape has one of the largest technology sectors in Africa, with around 550 companies employing over 40,000 people in the city of Cape Town alone. Cape Town itself is known as Africa's tech hub. Tech is one of the fastest-growing sectors of the province's economy. As of 2005 Cape Town hosts a large Amazon web services centre for its cloud computing services and customer services employing 1,400. The video game industry also has a strong presence in the region with 55% of South Africa's 60 game development studios in 2022 located in the Western Cape.

=== Financial and business services ===
The biggest sector in the Western Cape's economy is the financial, business services and real estate sectors contributing approximately R77 billion in 2008. The province is particularly strong in financial services associated with wealth management. As of 2018 Cape Town is the top ranked African city on the Global Financial Centres Index with the Western Cape hosting the fast-growing financial services sector in South Africa.

The first private banks in the Western Cape were established in Cape Town in the 1830s to take advantage of the city's then strategic importance to world trade and facilitate trade and investment in the local economy. A number of large financial companies were founded in the province, and continue to maintain a significant presence in the province's capital, Cape Town. The largest such company being Old Mutual which was founded in Cape Town in 1845. Financial services group Sanlam Limited is headquartered in Cape Town where it was founded in 1918. Investment and wealth management firm Allan Gray is also headquartered in Cape Town.

The business process outsourcing industry has grown in the Cape Town by 85% in 2016 contributing 20,500 jobs.

=== Energy ===
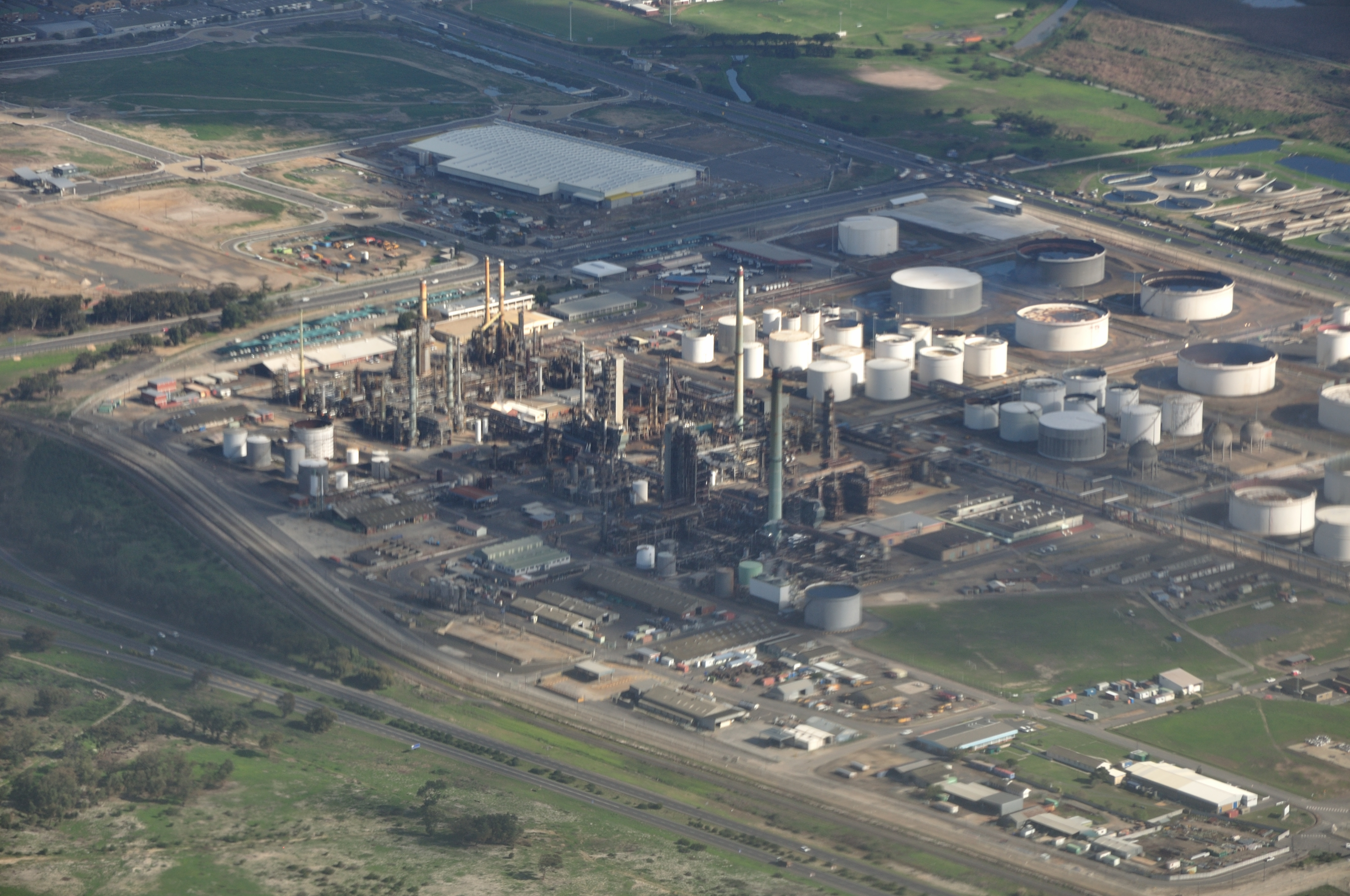
An aerial view of the Astron Energy Refinery in Cape Town

Oil, gas and other energy related industries play a significant role in the economy of the Western Cape. With South Africa's largest gas facility in Mossel Bay, natural offshore gas reserves, the province's strategic location and the Chevron Oil Refinery the region plays an important role in producing, processing and distributing petroleum products throughout the Southern African region.

The Astron Energy Refinery in Milnerton is the third-largest of four refineries in South Africa. and is capable of processing 100,000 barrels of crude oil a day whilst the PetroSA facility in Mossel Bay is capable of refining up to 45,000 barrels a day of synthetic gas-to-liquids. Combined this represents just over 20% of South Africa's refining capacity in 2018.

There is an estimated one trillion cubic feet of natural gas reserves in the Bredasdorp Basin south-east of Cape Town.

The province's strategic location plays an important role in the growth of the local energy industry. With 32.2% of all West Africa's and 23.7% of all Middle Eastern oil produced in these regions being transported around the Cape of Good Hope. The servicing and maintenance of oil rigs and shipping involved in the transportation of oil and gas is a significant industry in its own right.

Unlike much of the rest of the country, which relies on coal fired power plants, the Western Cape relies more on a mix of natural gas, nuclear, and renewable energy to provide the bulk of its electricity. This has resulted in the majority of South Africa's growing renewable energy industry being based in the province. Renewable energy companies headquartered in Cape Town include Treetops, SOLA Group, Mulilo, Phelan Green Energy, GreenCape, Red Rocket, African Clean Energy Developments, and G7 Renewable Energies.

=== Manufacturing ===
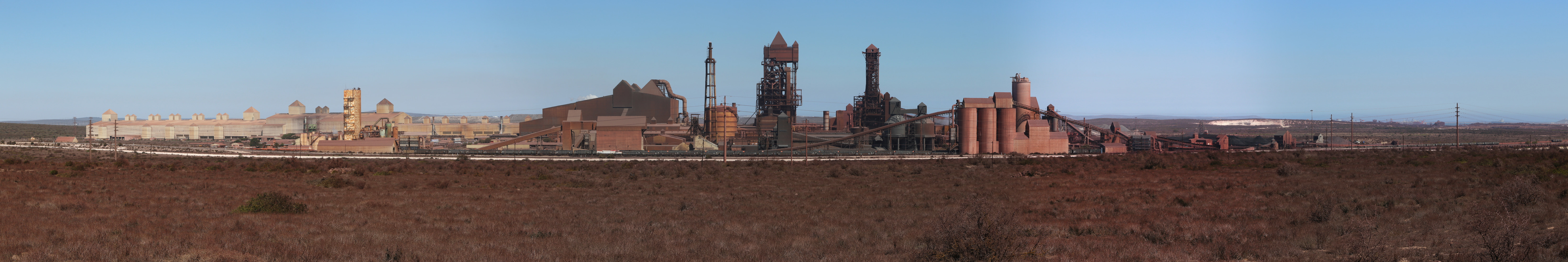
A panoramic view of the ArcelorMittal steel works at Saldanha Bay.

Manufacturing was the second largest contributor to the Western Cape's economy valued at R43.7 billion in 2008. The province's manufacturing sector has proven to be more robust than the rest of the country as a large part of the manufacturing sector is made up of a food processing sector whose products have been in relatively constant demand. The Western Cape accounts for half of South Africa's domestic production of cheese.

The largest manufacturing industry in the province is the clothing and textile industry, which employs over 170,000 people. The textile industry is presently declining in importance, due to competition with cheaper Eastern producers, such as China. The Saldanha Steel mill in Saldanha was a major producer and exporter of hot-rolled carbon steel; designed to produce 1,25 million tons of hot-rolled carbon steel coil per year, the mill was mothballed in 2020. The petrochemical and plastics industry, furniture, printing, pharmaceuticals, and publishing are also significant industries.

Of increasing importance to the province's economy are the production of and research in information technology, telecommunications, medical equipment, research equipment and other hi-tech industries. The Capricorn Science and Industrial Park in the Cape Town suburb of Muizenberg is an important growth node of the hi-tech industry in the province.

Companies with notable manufacturing operations in the province includes electronics producer Tellumat and General Electric, white goods producer Hisense, personal care products producers Kimberly-Clark and GlaxoSmithKline.

=== Tourism ===
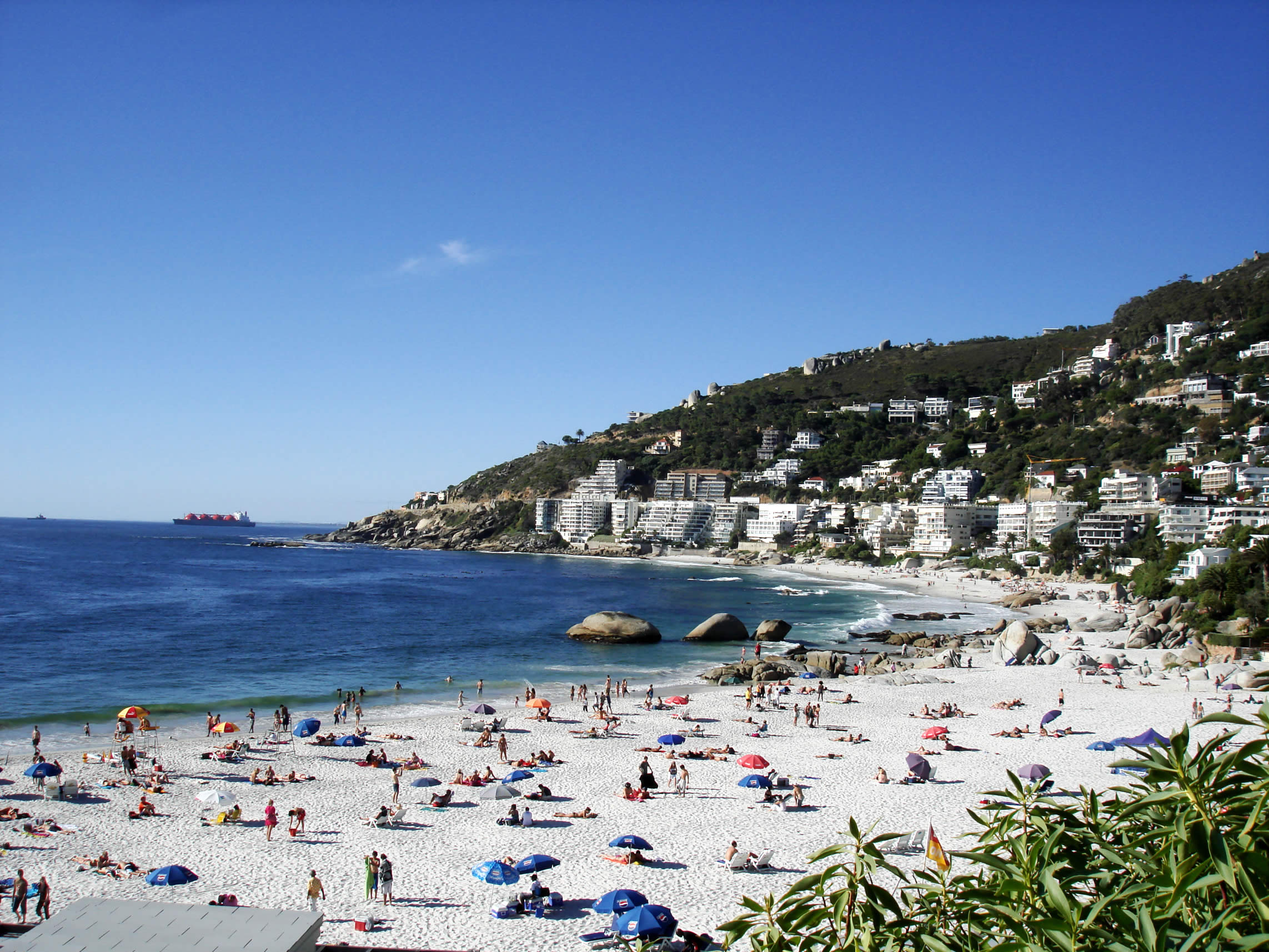
Tourism is an important sector in the province's economy.

The province has grown a large tourism industry since 1994. The majority of international tourist visiting South Africa visit the province, with Cape Town, Garden Route and the Winelands being popular tourist destinations. In 2004, Cape Town was listed as one of the top five international tourist destinations. Fifty percent of international tourists to South Africa visit the Western Cape. The province's overall share of South Africa's tourism sector by gross expenditure is 24 percent and totalling R23.1 billion (US$1.8 billion) in 2017.

Around 8 million tourists visit the province each year. Domestic tourism is also on the rise, as low-cost air carriers make travel more affordable to more South Africans.

In 2016, the seven most visited locations in the Western Cape were the V&A Waterfront, Cape of Good Hope, Boulders Beach, Table Mountain Cableway, Kirstenbosch Botanical Gardens, and Robben Island.

Tourism in the Western Cape is promoted and reported on by Wesgro, a Western Cape government entity, and the province's official tourism, trade, and investment promotion agency.

=== Agriculture and Fishing ===
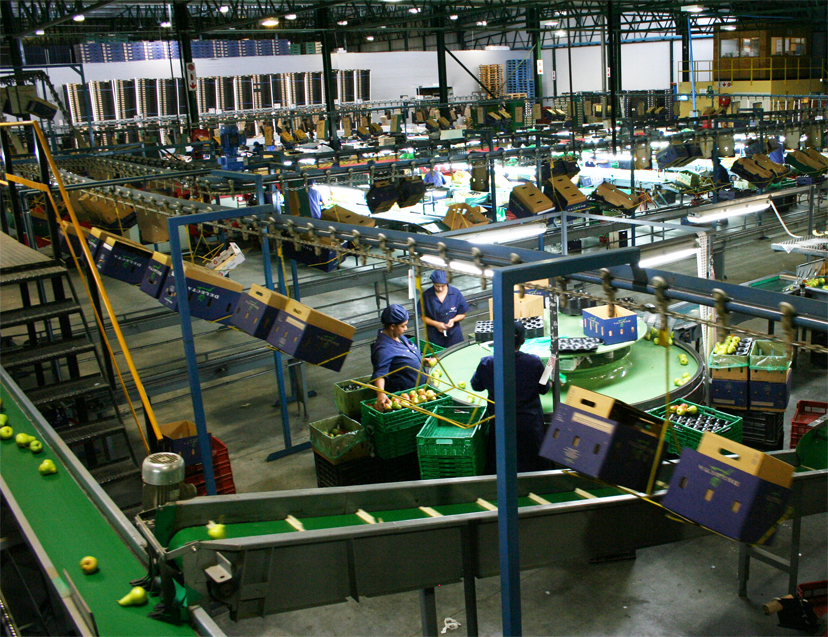
Workers packing pears for export in a packing house in the Ceres valley.

Although agriculture accounts for a relatively small proportion of overall economic output of the province, the Western Cape nevertheless accounts for the highest gross value of agricultural production of all of South Africa's provinces. The sector consists of 9,480 small scale farmers and 6,653 large scale commercial farmers.

Around 11,5 million hectare of land in the province is cultivated. Although this only represents 12.4% of the total land used for agriculture in South Africa, the Western Cape produces 55% to 60% of South Africa’s agricultural exports, valued at more than R7 billion (US$1 billion) a year. In 2008, the sector was also one of the fastest growing of the economy, expanding by 10.6%.

Key agricultural export products from the province include wine, wool, ostrich related products, essential oils and fruit. Wheat and other cereals are extensively cultivated in the Swartland and Overberg districts of the province. For most of the province's history exports have been dominated by agricultural products (primarily fruit, sea food, vegetables, wine and brandy). In 2017, fruit and wine exports generated R37 billion (US$2.87 billion) in foreign export earnings. Overall 400,000 people are directly and indirectly employed by industries in the agricultural value chain.

Water shortages caused by climate change is a notable recent challenge to the further development of the agriculture sector in the region. The 2015-2018 drought in the Western Cape had a large negative impact on the province's agricultural sector.

==== Alcohol ====
The Western Cape region has been famous for its wine since the late 18th century and exports wine all over the world. In 2010 the Western Cape exported 374.8 million litres of wine. With 100,200ha of vines under cultivation the province is the ninth largest exporter of wine in the world.

Distilled wine or brandy is produced in the area long the R62 around the towns of Worcester, Robertson, Barrydale, Calitzdorp and Oudtshoorn. Brandy is also produced around the towns of Paarl, Stellenbosch, Franschhoek, Wellington and Grabouw. Brandy from these regions are regarded as amongst the best in the world.

As of 2019, the province accounts for half of the beer microbreweries in South Africa.

==== Fruit ====
With 52,300ha of fruit trees under cultivation the province is also well known for its fruit and fruit related products. 40% of all fruit grown in South Africa originates from the Western Cape. The vast majority of South Africa's pome (apples & pears) fruit and most of its stone fruit is grown in the province. Around 687,121 tons of apples and 345,296 tons of pears were exported in 2008.

Ceres Fruit Juices originated in the town of Ceres and is a major exporter of fruit juices to North America, Europe, and Asia. Appletiser, a popular sparkling fruit juice, originated from and all production is based in the town of Elgin. The major fruit growing regions of the province are Ceres, Grabouw, and Villiersdorp.

The Western Cape produces 90% of South Africa's olive oil and the province has experienced "astonishing growth" in this product. Between 2012 and 2019, olive groves grew 640% from 60 ha to 420 ha.

==== Fishing ====
Around 75% of all commercial fishing in South Africa takes place along the Western Cape's coastline. The provinces rich cold water fishing grounds are abundant in marine life. Marine life such as spiny lobster (locally known as crayfish), abalone, snoek, squid, octopus, oysters and mussels are extensively fished. The fishing of spiny lobster and abalone is heavily regulated due to their high value and dwindling population due to extensive poaching.

== Special economic zones ==
The Western Cape has two of the five operating special economic zones (SEZ) within South Africa; the Saldanha Bay Industrial Development Zone and the Atlantis SEZ. Invigorated in 2013 the Saldanha Bay Industrial Development Zone is based around the port at Saldanha Bay and is focused on supporting the growth of the energy and marine services industries. The Atlantis SEZ is focused on renewable energy and green technology manufacturing and is based around the town of Atlantis, a satellite community of Cape Town.

== Graphs ==
GDPR growth rates from 2008 to 2014 and 2014 to 2024.
View chart definition.

Western Cape's GDP contribution compared to other South African provinces in 2024.
1. Gauteng (33.2%)
2. Kwa-Zulu Natal (16.1%)
3. Western Cape (14.2%)
4. Eastern Cape (7.80%)
5. Mpumalanga (8.00%)
6. Limpopo (7.80%)
7. North West Province (6.00%)
8. Free State (5.00%)
9. Northern Cape (2.20%)
Main sectors as a proportion of GDP in 2024.
1. Financial and business services (29.5%)
2. Manufacturing (16.1%)
3. Wholesale & Retail trade; hotels & restaurants (14.8%)
4. Community, social and personal services (11.9%)
5. Transport, storage and personal services (9.70%)
6. Agriculture (5.20%)
7. General government services (6.20%)
8. Construction (3.50%)
9. Electricity and Water (3.00%)
10. Other (0.10%)

== See also ==
- Western Cape Government
- Wesgro
