= Job simulation game =

Video game genre

Job simulation game, also known as job simulator or job sim, is a genre of simulation video game centered on performing tasks associated with particular occupations, such as farming, driving and delivering packages. It is distinguished from business simulation games, which generally place greater emphasis on management and higher-level decision-making. Examples of job simulation games predate the 2020s, while the genre became more visible during the late 2010s and 2020s. The 2019 post-apocalyptic delivery game Death Stranding was a AAA example, while numerous indie games in the genre were released during the 2020s, some of which overlap with cozy games. Players may use job simulators to experience aspects of occupations they do not perform themselves or variations on jobs with which they are already familiar.

== Examples ==
House Flipper, released in 2018, focuses on the real estate practice of house flipping. SnowRunner, released in 2020, is an off-road delivery simulator. In 2022, Hardspace: Shipbreaker, in which the player works as a starship shipbreaker for the corporation Lynx, and PowerWash Simulator, which centres on pressure washing, were released. In 2025, Cabin Crew Life Simulator earned its developers more than US$100,000. In 2026, Cozy Lives released Dressmaker, in which the player works as a dressmaker.

Delivery games are a related type of job simulation in which players transport objects or packages between locations. Examples include American Truck Simulator (2016), Lake (2021), and the Death Stranding games.

Job-simulation mechanics have also been added to other games through mods. A mod for the open-world third-person shooter Red Dead Redemption 2 allows protagonist Arthur Morgan to take work from a job board, while Oblivion Remastered received a mod adding similar job mechanics.

== See also ==
- Construction and management simulation
- Life simulation game
- Vehicle simulation game
