= Football Genius: The Ultimate Quiz =

2009 sports-trivia video game

- Cover art on the Xbox 360 Marketplace
- Developer(s): I-Imagine Interactive
- Publisher(s): RTL Interactive
- Director(s): Dan Wagner
- Producer(s): Nico Zettler; Gregor Bellmann; Thomas Heil
- Platform(s): Xbox 360
- Release: September 30, 2009
- Genre(s): Sports, trivia
- Mode(s): Single-player, multiplayer

Football Genius: The Ultimate Quiz is a sports-trivia video game developed by South African studio I-Imagine Interactive and published by RTL Interactive. It was released on September 30, 2009, worldwide, for the Xbox 360.

== Gameplay ==
Football Genius: The Ultimate Quiz tests the player's football knowledge with over 3,500 trivia questions and visual puzzles. The game features a variety of different modes, including a single-player campaign, a multiplayer mode, and a challenge mode. The game is said to appeal to fans of football of all ages.

In the single-player campaign, the player will play through a series of different challenges, each of which will test their knowledge of a different aspect of football. For example, one challenge might ask the player to name all of the players on a particular team, while another challenge might ask them to identify the different types of penalties that can be called in a football game.

In the multiplayer mode, the player will compete against other players to see which of them knows the most about football. The multiplayer mode features a variety of different game types, including a head-to-head mode, a tournament mode, and a cooperative mode.

In the challenge mode, the player will be given a set of questions to answer in a limited amount of time. The goal of the challenge mode is to answer as many questions correctly as possible.

== Reception ==
Reception

Aggregate score
Aggregator	Score
Metacritic	61/100

Review scores
Publication	Score
IGN	7.3/10
Official Xbox Magazine (US)	4.5/10
PALGN	45/100

Football Genius: The Ultimate Quiz received "mixed or average" reviews according to review aggregator Metacritic.

Nate Ahearn for IGN rated the game 7.3/10, stating that "While there's nothing standout or extraordinary about Football Genius, it serves its purpose well and deserves a recommendation for those looking to test their soccer knowledge."

The Official Xbox Magazine stated that "unless you're an absolute aficionado of international soccer, you'll be lost."
