= Gorn (video game) =

2019 video game

- Developer: Free Lives
- Publisher: Devolver Digital
- Engine: Unity
- Platforms: Windows, PlayStation 4, Oculus Quest, PlayStation 5
- Release: Windows; July 18, 2019; PlayStation 4; May 19, 2020; Oculus Quest; January 28, 2021; PlayStation 5; March 16, 2023
- Genre: Beat 'em up
- Modes: Single-player, multiplayer

Gorn (stylized as GORN) is a 2019 virtual reality hack and slash video game developed by Free Lives and published by Devolver Digital. The player is a gladiator who fights opponents to death in arena using weapons at their disposal. The game was launched in early access in 2016, and had a full release on July 18, 2019 for Microsoft Windows. A PlayStation VR version released in 2020 and an Oculus Quest port followed in 2021. An updated version for the PlayStation VR2 was released March 16, 2023. A sequel titled Gorn 2 was released on April 17, 2025.

== Gameplay ==
Enemies in GORN can have armor, which blocks attacks on covered body parts.

Gorn is a wave based game; the player has to clear the arena of enemies to progress. At the start of each wave, the player is offered a choice between weapons. Gorn has weapons such as spears, sledgehammers, and crab claws that can be used to dispatch opponents. The game features a dismemberment system, which allows the player to chop a limb off to disable or kill an enemy. Clearing a certain number of waves leads to a boss fight that the player needs to complete to progress. If the player takes damage, the edge of the screen turns red, and if the player doesn't manage to kill an enemy before the screen goes completely red, they have to restart from a checkpoint.

== Development ==
Free Lives mostly relied on player feedback for the weapons, tuning the weight and feel of them over the course of early access. The visuals were designed to be seen with the low resolutions of older VR headsets, so they prioritized readability in the characters and world design. The developer mentioned some lessons they brought to Gorn from Broforce was not to take the game too seriously and to focus on giving the player freedom over more restrictive design. Later in early access, a local multiplayer mode was added that let a second player control a gladiator with a gamepad. The optimizations made for the PSVR version helped Free Lives to quickly make the Oculus Quest version. The team faced issues in terms of the framerate and resolution they had to hit on the Quest, which they solved by reworking the shaders and optimizing all of the art assets.

The game does not currently have any major content updates planned.

== Reception ==
Reception

Aggregate score
Aggregator	Score
Metacritic	PC: 85/100; PS4: 68/100

Review scores
Publication	Score
Destructoid	7/10
UploadVR	8.5/10

Gorn received "generally favorable" to "mixed or average" reviews according to Metacritic. The PSVR version received “mixed to average reviews.””

UploadVR's Jamie Feltham gave the game a positive review, writing that, "It's a game of violent experimentation, discovering what twisted new means of punishment you can dish out with each passing weapon. Not everything is an effective killing machine but, more importantly, they're mostly a heck of a lot of fun to use." He was more mixed on the game's lack of content, "And yet, for all the laughs, you can't help but wish there was something a little meatier here. You can see through Gorn's handful of levels in a few hours."

Jordan Devore of Destructoid felt that while Gorn wasn't revolutionary, its unique weapons helped differentiate it from other wave based VR games.
