= Albert & Otto =

2015 video game

- Developer: K Bros Games
- Publisher: K Bros Games
- Engine: Unity
- Platforms: Windows, Mac, PlayStation 4, Xbox One
- Release: Windows, Mac: WW: October 28, 2015; iOS: WW: August 8, 2016; Xbox One: WW: January 10, 2018; PS4: WW: January 16, 2018
- Genre: Puzzle-platform
- Mode: Single-player

Albert & Otto is a 2D puzzle-platform game developed and published by K Bros Games. The game will release as four stand-alone episodes, with the first episode titled "The Adventure Begins" releasing on October 28, 2015, for Microsoft Windows and OS X. The game was released for Xbox One on January 10, 2018, and for the PlayStation 4 on January 16.

The art style was inspired by Tim Burton's early stop-motion films, with a story set in pre-World War II Germany.

== Gameplay ==
In Albert & Otto, the player controls both Albert and his magical bunny. In Episode One, Albert can shoot and jump, while Otto can fit through tight gaps and hold down power switches. When Albert is carrying Otto, he can execute a double jump, levitate, and control electrical currents. These powers are used in various combinations to solve puzzles and fight bosses.

== Plot ==
Albert's beloved sister, Anna, is abducted from their family home by shadows. Albert embarks on a journey to find her, encountering Otto, her beloved stuffed bunny, along the way. When he picks up Otto, Albert is imbued with special powers, and the two work together to overcome murderous beasts and lethal puzzles. But Anna appears to Albert in recurring sequences, indicating that what seems like a journey to save the damsel in distress is anything but. Clues during gameplay suggest that Albert might be hiding something from the player and himself.

== Development and release ==
The game was developed by Nikola Kostic, a South-African independent game developer. He is solely responsible for the art, design, and programming. The music was composed by Robert Frost III in a basement in Minneapolis, Minnesota.

Albert & Otto was released for iOS on August 8, 2016, Xbox One on January 10, 2018, and the PlayStation 4 on January 16.

== Reception ==
Reception

Aggregate score
Aggregator	Score
Metacritic	PC: 69/100; XONE: 63/100

On Metacritic, Albert & Otto has a "mixed or average" rating for both the Xbox One and PC versions. Aaron Morales of Entertainment Weekly named it one of "The best games from the showfloor" from PAX East. Eric Chetkauskas of OpRainfall previewed the game at PAX East, saying, "This is easily one of the best games I played at PAX and I cannot wait for this game to be released." Several reporters compared the game to Limbo.
