= Magical Craft: My Enchanted Dress Shop =

2025 life simulation game

- Developer: syn Sophia
- Publisher: Imagineer
- Platform: Nintendo Switch
- Release: JP: 6 November 2025; AS: 18 June 2026; NA/EU/AU: 2 October 2026
- Genre: Life simulation
- Mode: Single-player

Magical Craft: My Enchanted Dress Shop (Note: Japanese: マジカルクラフト 猫と魔法のドレス, Hepburn: Magical Craft: Neko to Mahou no Dress) is a 2025 life simulation game developed by syn Sophia and published by Imagineer for the Nintendo Switch. The game centres on dressmaking and dress-up, with players creating dresses for the residents of a village using magical sewing techniques.

Magical Craft was released in Japan on 6 November 2025 and digitally in Asia on 18 June 2026. A physical edition was released in North America, Europe and Australia on 2 October 2026, although the planned Western digital release was delayed.

== Gameplay ==
The player controls Lilia, an aspiring dressmaker living in the village of Fleune. Inspired by her grandmother, from whom she inherited the ability to use "sewing magic", Lilia hopes to become a "legendary dressmaker" by creating dresses for the villagers.

Lilia is accompanied by Jam, a cat who travels with her around the village. Other cats can be befriended to obtain items. Players explore Fleune to gather fabrics, patterns and other materials needed to make dresses.

Dresses are designed by combining different fabrics, colours, patterns and decorative motifs. The sewing process consists of minigames representing four types of sewing magic. Completed dresses can be worn by Lilia or given to villagers, whose outfits can be coordinated by fulfilling their requests.

As Lilia's dressmaking level increases, new designs and areas of the village become available. The Entertainment Software Rating Board (ESRB) describes the game as a simulation in which the player helps a seamstress operate a magical atelier.

== Development and release ==
Imagineer and syn Sophia announced Magical Craft: My Enchanted Dress Shop in July 2025, with a Japanese release scheduled for 6 November. Syn Sophia had previously developed the Style Savvy series and Fashion Dreamer, both of which also centre on clothing and fashion.

An ESRB rating for an English-language version appeared in February 2026. Imagineer subsequently announced that the game would be released digitally in Asia on 18 June, followed by physical and digital editions in North America, Europe and Australia on 2 October under the title Magical Craft: My Enchanted Dress Shop. The international editions support seven languages: Japanese, English, Traditional Chinese, Simplified Chinese, Korean, German and French.

The physical edition was released in North America, Europe and Australia on 2 October 2026, but the digital edition was not available as scheduled. Imagineer subsequently apologised for the delay and stated that a new release date would be announced once confirmed. In a statement reported on 6 October, the publisher confirmed that preparations for the digital release were continuing and that no new date had been set.

== Reception ==
The four reviewers in the Japanese magazine Famitsu awarded Magical Craft: My Enchanted Dress Shop scores of 7, 8, 8 and 7 out of 10, for a combined score of 30 out of 40.

The reviewers praised the range of clothing designs and the ability to combine fabrics, patterns and decorations. They also enjoyed seeing villagers wear dresses made by the player. However, several considered the sewing minigames repetitive, while criticisms of the interface included frequent loading screens, unclear quest information and awkward controls. One reviewer also found that the automatic movement system limited exploration of the village.

== See also ==
- Style Savvy
- Dressmaker
- Syn Sophia
