= Genital Jousting =

2018 video game

- Developer: Free Lives
- Publisher: Devolver Digital
- Producer: Shaz Greenwood
- Designers: Evan Greenwood; Richard Pieterse; Robbie Fraser
- Artists: Stuart Coutts; Marcelle Marais
- Writer: Jon Keevy
- Composers: Jason Sutherland; Martin Kvale
- Engine: Unity
- Platforms: Windows, macOS
- Release: January 18, 2018 (Win); May 18, 2018 (Mac)
- Genre: Party
- Modes: Single-player, multiplayer

Genital Jousting is a party video game developed by Free Lives and published by Devolver Digital for Windows and macOS in 2018.

== Gameplay ==
In this multiplayer party game, players attempt to move flaccid, disembodied penises into disembodied anuses. The game supports up to eight players locally or online. In addition to the Traditional Mode, there is a Party Mode that features Mario Party-style minigames, and Date Mode that features two-player co-op gameplay. In the story mode the player is John, a working man that is looking for a date for his high school reunion.

== Development ==
On November 17, 2016, Genital Jousting was made available through the Steam Early Access program. Though Genital Jousting has been described as "extraordinarily juvenile", it was designed in part to deliver a sex-positive message to an audience that might not come to hear it otherwise. The studio stated in its developer blog that heterosexual men are socialized not to discuss how they feel about anal sex or penises touching each other, and wrote: "we were highly motivated by the fact that Genital Jousting gave us a vehicle to have those discussions amongst ourselves." Greenwood told The Sunday Times that "at heart, the game is a play on masculinity, an attempt to disrupt entrenched notions of male power and authority." The game would not be allowed on major console platforms such as Xbox or PlayStation. When Genital Jousting was banned from livestreaming service Twitch, Nigel Lowrie of Devolver Digital contacted Steam to see if the game could be livestreamed through the platform's internal broadcasting system. Genital Jousting became the first game to be broadcast through Steam's live streaming feature.

== Reception ==
Reception

Aggregate score
| Aggregator | Score |
|---|---|
| Metacritic | 68/100 |

Review scores
| Publication | Score |
|---|---|
| Destructoid | 7.5/10 |
| GameStar | 66/100 |
| Hardcore Gamer | 3/5 |
| IGN | 6/10 |
| MeriStation | 6.5/10 |
| CGMagazine | 9.5/10 |
| Gamer.nl | 7/10 |
| Multiplayer.it | 5.5/10 |

Genital Jousting received "mixed or average" reviews according to review aggregator Metacritic.

The multiplayer was regarded as the core of the game and fun until the joke starts to wear thin. The story mode was deemed surprisingly emotional but too short.

CGMagazine described the story's handling of the aftermath of a sexual assault as "problematic". Hardcore Gamer said the gameplay in story mode is so different to multiplayer that "there's a rather huge disconnect between both halves of the game and it just leaves things feeling awkward."
