= Broforce =

2015 video game

- Developer: Free Lives
- Publisher: Devolver Digital
- Director: Evan Greenwood
- Producer: Shaz Greenwood
- Designers: Evan Greenwood; Dorian Dutrieux
- Programmers: Evan Greenwood; Ruan Rothmann; Richard Pieterse
- Artists: Jarred Lunt; Dawid Strauss; Filip Orekhov; Jonathan Hau-Yoon; Dorian Dutrieux; Duncan Greenwood; Philipe Rios
- Composer: Deon van Heerden
- Engine: Unity
- Platforms: Windows; OS X; Linux; PlayStation 4; Nintendo Switch; Xbox One
- Release: Windows, OS X; 15 October 2015; Linux; 17 October 2015; PS4; 1 March 2016; Switch; 6 September 2018; Xbox One; 8 August 2023
- Genre: Run-and-gun
- Modes: Single-player, multiplayer

Broforce is a 2015 side-scrolling run and gun game developed by Free Lives and published by Devolver Digital. The game has the player as one of several "bros", based on popular culture action movie icons (for example, John Rambo and Ellen Ripley – "bro" treated as a gender neutral term), rescuing other "bros" through highly destructible environments.

Development began in April 2012 as a game jam entry and continued with developer and popular support, existing as an Early Access game. The game was released on 15 October 2015 for Microsoft Windows and OS X, and a Linux port followed two days later. A PlayStation 4 version was released on 1 March 2016 and a Nintendo Switch port was released on 6 September 2018. It was later released for Xbox One on 8 August 2023.

== Gameplay ==
Animation of a miniboss fight, displaying gameplay and the game's destructible environment

The player-character is a bro, a hypermasculine action hero-style commando, who fights terrorists and rescues his bro teammates and prisoners of war from captivity. The game's destructible environments wear away with the player's gunfire. The levels end when the player defeats a devil boss, hoists an American flag, and leaves via helicopter while the scenery explodes.

The Broforce includes dozens of characters, and the player earns more as they rescue a certain number of prisoners of war. These Broforce characters, under direction of "Nelson Brodela", are parodies of mostly fictional action heroes, including John Rambo, Die Hard's John McClane, Chuck Norris, Mr. T, Alien's Ellen Ripley, and Terminator's T-800; they are often named by adding the word "bro" to the original name in some manner (e.g., Rambro, the Brominator). The player does not have control on which Broforce character they will start the level with, and each time that character dies or a prisoner of war is rescued, they will be switched to a different Broforce character. Each character has unique attacks and moves based on the fictional hero; for example, Ripley's character has a flamethrower special ability, while the Indiana Jones–based character primarily uses a whip.

== Development ==
Free Lives submitted Rambros as an entry in the April 2012 Ludum Dare 23 game jam. It won first prize for "fun" and received enough positive feedback to continue as a team project. The developers thought to add a cooperative mode with another character, Brommando, which then became the core game concept of collecting "bros" with a "violent action movie feel".

The game's interest in "bros" stems from game director Evan Greenwood's love for action films from the 1980s and 1990s, which led to the game's aesthetics, themes, and gameplay, like traveling to outer space, fighting a dinosaur, and racing sharks. The bros share a kinship in each other's self-defense and when fighting terrorism together. Greenwood has called Broforce a "loving portrayal of action heroes". The developers debated the addition of female heroes and their place alongside the game's existing tropes. They chose not to add a "token female" or to create a rival female Broforce for plot or romance purposes, and instead made the female characters part of the existing team so as not to distinguish by gender.

The game was designed to be a lighthearted hyperbole of the 1980s action film genre. Greenwood noted the difficulties of translating the genre's trope of remorseless violence into the 2013 climate surrounding foreign relations and human casualties of battle, particularly the stories of individual heroes waging unilateral war on a region. The team balanced what it saw as a modern perspective on war with their cultural heritage from the 1980s films, and hoped that their game would challenge "bro culture" stereotypes of irresponsibility and drunkenness with a sense of righteousness and a positive manliness.

In July 2013, Greenwood commented that the team wanted to build a space opera with roguelike elements, Contra-style aliens, themes of Satan in big business, betrayal, and bro identity, explosions that create weightlessness, and a story where the Broforce themselves are rescued. He discussed a cyborg bro who questions his bro and human status for not having feelings before realizing that the other bros do not feel either.

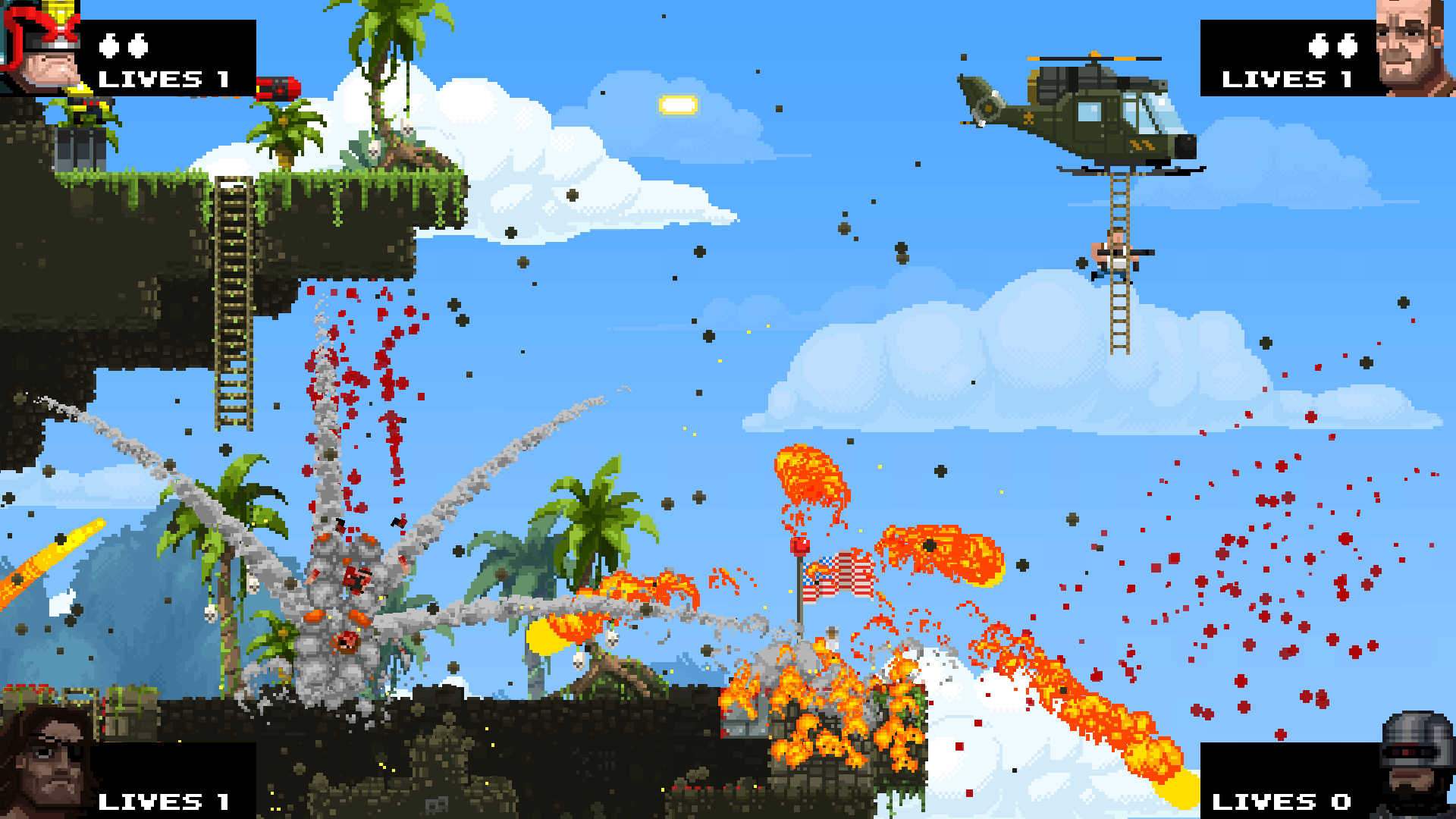
Screenshot showcasing the end sequence, where the player has to reach for a helicopter while leaving the area with explosions

A free Broforce game demo called "Brototype" was released from the developer's website, which sampled the gameplay but not the game's narrative. The game was approved on Steam Greenlight on 24 July 2013 and open for Steam Early Access on 7 April 2014 with a planned full release in Q2 2014 for Microsoft Windows and consoles. The final game is expected to include online multiplayer, deathmatch arenas with leaderboards, a level editor, and better graphics.

In August 2014, a standalone expansion based on The Expendables 3 called The Expendabros was released. Later, The Expendabros expansion became free-to-play in order to promote The Expendables 3 film and remained so until 31 December of that year.

In February 2015, the game was expanded with the adding of Alien Infestation. On 15 October 2015, the game was fully released and again expanded, with the ability to fight Satan. The full game, without The Expendabros expansion, was ported to PlayStation 4 and released on 1 March 2016. A Nintendo Switch port was announced in July 2018.

A major and the final expansion to the game, named Broforce Forever, was released on August 8, 2023. The expansion added more playable characters and missions.

== Reception ==
Reception

Aggregate score
Aggregator	Score
Metacritic	PC: 83/100; PS4: 68/100; NS: 74/100

Review scores
Publication	Score
IGN	8.8/10
PC Gamer (US)	78/100
The Escapist	4.5/5

Eurogamer's Jeffrey Matulef described the game demo as an "instantly addictive throwback to retrogaming" and noted the uniqueness of its destructible environment. Several reporters compared the game to Terraria. IGN awarded it a score of 8.8 out of 10, saying "Beneath Broforce's bad puns and bulging biceps lies a brilliant ode to action cinema and retro gaming." The Escapist awarded it four and a half stars out of five, saying "Broforce is a silly, but sincere love letter to iconic action movies, refined to perfection with rich environments and wonderfully-crafted enemies."

== See also ==
- Dudebro II
