= Free Lives =

South African video game developer

- Type: Private
- Industry: Video games
- Founded: April 2012; 14 years ago
- Founder: Evan Greenwood
- Headquarters: Cape Town, South Africa
- Key people: Evan Greenwood (Creative Director)
- Products: Broforce; Genital Jousting; Gorn
- Number of employees: 16 (2018)
- Website: freelives.net

Free Lives is a South African independent video game developer based in Cape Town. Founded in April 2012 and led by creative director Evan Greenwood, Free Lives is best known for creating the video game Broforce and has also developed the comedy game Genital Jousting and the virtual reality game Gorn.

Free Lives' games have mostly been published by Devolver Digital, making them one of the most prolific developers under the Devolver brand.

== History ==
=== Background ===
Free Lives was founded in April 2012 by video game programmer and creative director Evan Greenwood and is based on a property that is part studio, part house in Cape Town, South Africa. The titles developed by Free Lives do not sell well on the African continent and the studio's audience lies predominantly in the United States, as well as Europe, South America, and China. Free Lives staff have showcased their products at various North American and European game conventions, and was part of the Sony press conference at E3 2017.

As of 2017, some of the Free Lives staff lives on-site, making use of a communal kitchen.

=== Video games ===
Free Lives first got involved with the video game industry when the team entered Rambros, a pixel art 2D shooter game inspired by 1980s and 1990s action movies, in the April 2012 Ludum Dare game jam. Rambros was awarded for its graphics and humor at Ludum Dare, and Free Lives continued to expand and tweak the game in the following years. Rambros was soon renamed to Broforce and was made freely available on the Free Lives website the next year. Broforce was first officially released through Steam Greenlight in 2013, and received a spin-off titled The Expendabros in 2014. After one of the Free Lives team members met publisher Devolver Digital at the A Maze indie festival in Berlin, Devolver Digital signed the studio on and Broforce was published in 2015.

Late 2016, Free Lives made the comedy game Genital Jousting available through the Steam Early Access program. In this multiplayer party game, players attempt to move flaccid, disembodied penises into disembodied anuses. Though Genital Jousting has been described as "extraordinarily juvenile", it was designed in part to deliver a sex-positive message to an audience that might not come to hear it otherwise. The studio stated in its developer blog that cisgender, heterosexual men are socialized not to discuss how they feel about anal sex or penises touching each other, and wrote: "we were highly motivated by the fact that Genital Jousting gave us a vehicle to have those discussions amongst ourselves."

Greenwood told The Sunday Times that "at heart, the game is a play on masculinity, an attempt to disrupt entrenched notions of male power and authority." The game would not be allowed on major console platforms such as Xbox or PlayStation. When Genital Jousting was banned from livestreaming service Twitch, Nigel Lowrie of Devolver Digital contacted Steam to see if the game could be livestreamed through the platform's internal broadcasting system. Genital Jousting became the first game to be broadcast through Steam's live streaming feature.

On 10 July 2017, Free Lives released the virtual reality game Gorn for the Oculus Rift and HTC Vive on Steam Early Access. Described as a "ludicrously violent VR gladiator simulator," Gorn features a physics-driven combat engine and a large amount of violent gore. Free Lives stated that they used the Early Access service in order to be able to expand the game with features players want to see.

In October 2020, Free Lives partnered up with another independent video game development team to expand upon the video game Terra Nil. Under Free Lives, the "reverse-city builder" puzzle game received a new art style and gameplay features. This version of Terra Nil released in 2023.

== Cozy Lives ==
Cozy Lives is a small development team within Free Lives, formed to work on games distinct from the studio's action-oriented titles. The team developed Dressmaker, which originated as a prototype created by Terra Nil co-creator Jonathan Hau-Yoon with dressmaker Sabrina Becker. A three-person core team of Hau-Yoon, Ruan Rothmann and Sara Laubscher developed the full game, with Becker overseeing its dressmaking design and other Free Lives staff and contractors contributing to production. The prototype was begun in July 2025 and approved for full development by Free Lives in September. Dressmaker was released on 21 September 2026, with Cozy Lives credited as its developer and Free Lives as its publisher.

== Success ==
In an interview with MyGaming, Greenwood stated that the studio had made approximately US$3 million off of Broforce sales by 2016. The entire Free Lives team moved to Tamarin on the island nation of Mauritius for three months in late 2016, using the profit from their success with Broforce. Free Lives produced a video series here titled Game Jam Island, in which they documented their experience developing a video game on the popular vacation island.

== Games developed ==
Year	Title	Platform(s)	Publisher(s)
2014	The Expendabros	macOS, Windows	Devolver Digital
2015	Broforce	Linux, macOS, Nintendo Switch, PlayStation 4, Windows, Xbox One	Devolver Digital
2016	Yojimbrawl!	Windows	Humble Bundle
2018	Genital Jousting	macOS, Windows	Devolver Digital
2019	Gorn	PlayStation 4, PlayStation 5, Windows, Oculus Quest	Devolver Digital
2019	Cricket Through the Ages	iOS, macOS, tvOS, Windows, Nintendo Switch	Devolver Digital
2023	Terra Nil	Android, Nintendo Switch, iOS, Linux, macOS, Windows	Devolver Digital
2024	Anger Foot	Linux, macOS, Windows, PlayStation 5	Devolver Digital
2024	Stick it to the Stickman	Windows	Devolver Digital
2025	Gorn 2	Windows, Meta Quest	Devolver Digital
2026	Dressmaker	Windows, macOS	Free Lives

== Games published ==
Year	Title	Platform(s)	Developer(s)
2025	Side Effects	Windows	hirohun, Mr.Pootsley, Jaybooty, Lofar42
2026	Dressmaker	Windows, macOS	Cozy Lives
