= Temirtai Izbastin =

Kazakh former diplomat (born 1957)

- Теміртай Ізбастин

Kazakh ambassador to Bulgaria
- In office 2009 – 9 December 2022
- President: Nursultan Nazarbayev; Kassym-Jomart Tokayev
- Preceded by: Serjan Äbdikärimov
- Succeeded by: Viktor Temirbaev

Personal details
- Born: 10 September 1957 (age 69) Bayanaul, Pavlodar Region, Kazakh SSR, Soviet Union
- Spouse: Qarlyğa Izbastina
- Children: 4, including Dana Medeuova and Muhamed Izbastin
- Relatives: Kassym-Jomart Tokayev (brother-in-law)
- Education: Almaty State Medical Institute; Abai Kazakh National Pedagogical University; Sofia University (PhD)

Temirtai Rymtaiūly Izbastin (Note: Often transliterated as Temirtay Rymtaevich Izbastin through a Russified Romanization of Темиртай Рымтаевич Избастин.) (Note: Kazakh: Теміртай Рымтайұлы Ізбастин) (born 10 September 1957) is a Kazakh former diplomat served as the ambassador to Bulgaria from 2009 to 2022.

== Biography ==
Temirtai Rymtaiuly Izbastin was born on 10 September 1957 in Bayanaul, a village in Pavlodar Region, Kazakh SSR, Soviet Union (now Kazakhstan).

In 1980, he graduated from the Almaty State Medical Institute.

Izbastin began his diplomatic career in 1994, serving at the Kazakh embassies in Hungary and China. From 1997 to 2001, he served as the consul of Kazakhstan in Meerbusch, Germany. Concurrently, in 1999, he completed international diplomatic courses at the Diplomatic Academy of the Ministry of Foreign Affairs of Russia. From 2002 to 2005, he held the positions of consul and subsequently counselor at the Embassy of Kazakhstan in Austria.

In 2005, Izbastin returned to Kazakhstan, where he worked at the Foreign Ministry as a head of division, deputy director, and acting director of the Consular Service Department until 2009.

In 2008, he earned a law degree from the Abai Kazakh National Pedagogical University.

From 2004, the diplomatic representation of Kazakhstan in Bulgaria operated with a lower status than a full embassy, and was headed by a Chief of Mission with the rank of Chargé d'Affaires. Izbastin held this position from 2009 to 2019.

In 2015, he graduated from Sofia University with a PhD.

On 18 July 2019, president Kassym-Jomart Tokayev, who is Izbastin's brother-in-law reorganized the diplomatic mission into a full embassy. On 1 November of the same year, Tokayev appointed Izbastin as the ambassador to Bulgaria, making him the first official ambassador to the Bulgaria.

Following constitutional amendments adopted in June 2022, which barred close relatives of the president from holding high-ranking political offices, Izbastin was dismissed from his post by Tokayev on 9 December 2022. As a result, Izbastin represented Kazakhstan in Bulgaria from 2009 to 2022.

== Personal life ==
Izbastin is married to Qarlyğa Kemelqyzy Izbastina (Note: Often transliterated as Karlyga Kemelevna Izbastina through a Russified Romanization of Карлыга Кемелевна Избастина.) (Note: Kazakh: Қарлыға Кемелқызы Ізбастина) (née Tokayeva; born 19 September 1956), sister of Kazakh president Kassym-Jomart Tokayev. The Russian outlet IStories reported that Qarlyğa Izbastina once held Russian citizenship, owned a now‑inactive travel agency in Germany called Dana Reiseservice, and defended a doctoral dissertation at the Diplomatic Academy of the Russian Ministry of Foreign Affairs, from which Kassym‑Jomart Tokayev also graduated. Through her subsidiary companies, Qaraoba-2005 and Severny Katpar, she obtained licenses to mine tungsten at two deposits in the Karaganda Region, but the mining operations never commenced due to a lack of funding.

His eldest daughter Dana Medeuova (born 11 September 1978) has served as a member of the Kurultai since 2026.

Eldest son Qanyş Izbastin (Note: Often transliterated as Kanysh Temirtaevich Izbastin through a Russified Romanization of Каныш Темиртаевич Избастин.) (Note: Kazakh: Қаныш Темиртайұлы Ізбастин) (born 20 April 20 1981) served as the first deputy chairman of the Baiterek Holding from 2021 to 2022 (prior to the 2022 Kazakh unrest). In July 2022, journalist Mahambet Äbjan (Note: Often transliterated as Makhambet Abzhan through a Russified Romanization of Махамбет Абжан.) (Note: Kazakh: Махамбет Әбжан) published a post on his Telegram channel alleging that Qanyş Izbastin owned cryptocurrency mining farms. Following the publication, Äbjan reported encountering targeted smear campaigns against himself on local websites and Telegram channels. On July 5, 2022, Äbjan was detained for two months on suspicion of large-scale extortion involving threats to disseminate defamatory information in the media, as well as spreading intentionally false information. On February 3, 2023, Äbjan was sentenced to nine years in prison. Qanyş Izbastin is married to Botagöz Karbuzova (Note: Often transliterated as Botagoz Karbuzova through a Russified Romanization of Ботагоз Карбузова.) (Note: Kazakh: Ботагөз Қарбузова) (born 1982), the daughter of Qozy-Körpeş Karbuzov (Note: Often transliterated as Kozy-Korpesh Karbuzov through a Russified Romanization of Козы-Корпеш Карбузов.) (Note: Kazakh: Қозы-Көрпеш Қарбузов) (born 1959), the former deputy chairman of the NSK. In 2022, a 136-square-meter apartment valued at $1.4 million was discovered in her name in Florida, US. The couple has three daughters: Sara Ailan (born August 23, 2009), Safiya (born September 10, 2011), and Salma (born November 19, 2013).

Middle son Muhamed Izbastin (born 11 January 1982) is a co-founder of TSM Group, Kemel Tokayev Charitable Foundation and Abi Petroleum Kepital. Since 2026, he has served as the president of the Qazaq Cybersport Federation.

Youngest son Beket Izbastin (born 1984) has served since 2019 as the General Director of PSA, a state-owned company that acts on behalf of the Kazakhstan government in production sharing agreements for the Kashagan, Karachaganak, and Dunga oil projects.
