= Namibian Electronic Sports Association =

- Official Emblem
- Abbreviation: NESA
- Formation: 2010
- Type: National Sports Federation
- Headquarters: Windhoek, Namibia
- Members: 110 registered, estimated community: 15 000+
- Affiliations: Namibia Sports Commission, IeSF
- Staff: 0
- Volunteers: 8
- Website: https://www.esportsnamibia.org/

The Namibian Electronic Sports Association (NESA) is the governing and representative body for Electronic Sports in Namibia. It was founded in 2010, and affiliated to IeSF in 2011 as the third country from Africa to obtain membership after South Africa and Egypt. NESA organises various esports leagues and the Namibian National esports team. In 2012 it was closed due to lack of community interest and participation. It was re-opened in 2013 by the original founders and select members from the community. The first formal National Team was selected in 2014 for DotA2, called the Desert Sidewinders. NESA has since awarded National Colours via the Namibian Sports Commission annually and expanded on the number of National titles hosted per year. In 2017 NESA sent the very first Namibian esports athlete abroad to participate in Tekken7 at the IESF World Championship held in Busan, South Korea. More Namibian athletes has since then been sent to partake in the annual IESF World Championship and numerous online international test matches are hosted each year.

NESA continues to develop gaming as a sport within Namibia with the financial support from sponsors and volunteer work from gaming enthusiasts.

NESA is a member of the Confederation of African Esports (CAES) which was established in June 2007 by Mind Sports South Africa (MSSA).

NESA is actively working to support more African countries to recognise esports as an official sport and encourage related developments within African communities.

== Function ==
The Namibian Electronic Sports Association (NESA) serves as the governing and representative sports body for electronic sports (esports) in Namibia. NESA governs, facilitates, co-ordinates and administrates the primary and secondary objectives relating to esports in Namibia:

Primary Objectives

- Promotion: Promoting and marketing of esports to the public, corporate and government sectors
- Preparation: Development, training and funding of esports
- Participation: Participation in regional, national and international events and tournaments

Secondary Objectives

- Regulatory and sanctioning functions of esports
- Promote sportsmanship, discipline and sporting etiquette
- Promote healthy, sporting lifestyles and wellness
- Support esports related industries and service providers
- Promote legal electronic practices

== International Participation ==
- December 2010 vs South Africa (playing FIFA 2011 on Xbox)
- December 2010 vs South Africa (playing Call of Duty Modern Warfare on PC, 5vs5)

== Important Documents ==
- Constitution
- NESA Code of Ethics and Conduct
