= Mind Sports South Africa =

National controlling body for mind sports

- MSSA Logo
- Abbreviation: MSSA
- Formation: 14 December 1985; 40 years ago
- Type: Sports federation
- Legal status: Association
- Purpose: Controlling body for various mind sports in South Africa
- Headquarters: Germiston, South Africa
- Members: 105 clubs
- Official language: English, Afrikaans
- President: Mr. Colin Webster
- Affiliations: SASCOC, International e-Sports Federation, International Wargames Federation, FMJD, Confederation of African Esports
- Volunteers: 27
- Website: http://www.mssa.co.za/

Mind Sports South Africa (MSSA) is recognised by Act of Parliament as the national controlling body for mind sports in South Africa.

Mind Sports South Africa (MSSA) is also an affiliate of the International eSports Federation, Fédération Mondiale du Jeu de Dames, and the International Wargames Federation. Due to its membership of such international bodies, the MSSA is the sole authority for the games that it caters for in terms of the Sport and Recreation Act, number 110 of 1998 (as amended).

== History ==
Mind Sports South Africa was formally constituted on 14 December 1985. However, it was not until 1990 that the MSSA became a member of NOCSA in 1990, and in 1991 that the MSSA became affiliated to the Confederation of South African Sports Confederation (COSAS).

The MSSA was one of the members that encouraged unity during the apartheid era, and thus voted in favour of the unifying of sport. As a consequence of the actions of the many National Federations, the National Sports Council was formed in 1994 and was immediately accepted as a full member of the newly formed body. Upon dissolution of the NSC in 1999, the MSSA played its part in supporting the formation of the South African Sports Commission in 1999.

Once the South African Sports Commission was formed (by Act of Parliament) the MSSA again was accepted as a full member. Even when the Minister of Sport and Recreation saw the need to ask Parliament to amend the Sports and Recreation Act (number110 of 1998), the official recognition of Mind Sports South Africa remained unchanged as the MSSA became a founding member of the South African Sports Confederation and Olympic Committee (SASCOC).

All the games promoted by Mind Sports South Africa are accredited as national sports. Such accreditation by the Sports and Recreation Act (number110 of 1998), guarantees the MSSA as being the only authority for the administration and control of the games that fall under the MSSA's jurisdiction.

The MSSA changed its name in 2005 from the South African Wargames Union (SAWU) to that of Mind Sports South Africa.

== Structure ==
Mind Sports South Africa, like other sports federations in South Africa, is constituted as a voluntary association.

The highest authority of the MSSA is the Annual General Meeting which holds all Committees accountable for their actions.

The executive committee meets a minimum of twice a year, and requires a full report from the management board.

The management board deals with the day-to-day operations of the MSSA and overseas the different Boards of Control. Clubs are directly affiliated to the MSSA which ensures that there is greater transparency and inclusion.

== History of the emblem ==
Back in the early 1990s, the South African Wargames Union (as the MSSA was then known) was invited to participate in the World Team Championships for Wargames. Up until that point the MSSA used the rampant lion as its symbol. However, it was felt by the committee to approach the State Herald to design something specifically for the MSSA that best represented the games as administered by the MSSA. The State Herald Frederick Brownell designed the Janus Knight for the MSSA.

The logo is made up of the following aspects:

The double-headed knight chess piece: The knight chess piece is already an international symbol for army battle school. The symbol represents tactical and strategic thought and training. By making the symbol a double-headed knight, it also incorporates the concepts of considering the opponent's moves and shows the mental versatility of gamers.

The circle: The circle represents the rules to which all the games are played, and the unity of all the games that the MSSA represents.

== Disciplines and games under the jurisdiction of the MSSA ==
In terms of its Constitution, Mind Sports South Africa caters for a wide variety of Mind Sports in South Africa, such as:

Board gaming

- Backgammon
- Draughts (Anglo-American, Pool Checkers and International)
- Morabaraba (also known as Mlabalaba)
- Moruba
- SesothoMorabaraba
- Speed Stacking

Card gaming

Figure gaming

- Ancients (3000 BC to 1500 AD)
- Pike & Shot (1500 AD to 1700 AD)
- Horse & Musket (1700 to 1845)
- World War II (1939 to 1945)

eSports

- Console gaming
- Mobile gaming
- PSP gaming
- Personal computer gaming

Robotics

== How games are chosen ==
Every year the MSSA holds an Annual General Meeting (AGM)directly after the South African National Championships. It is at such AGM that the games to be played in the Esports Discipline are selected by the member clubs.

=== Esports titles to be played at 2021 Provincial and National Championships ===
Saturday	Clash Royale	FIFA 21	Hearthstone	Paladins	Street Fighter V	League of Legends
Sunday	Counter-Strike: Global Offensive	Dota 2	Tekken 7			

=== Esports titles to be played at 2021 Online School Championships ===
Clash Royale	Counter-Strike: GO	Dota 2	FIFA 19	League of Legends	Paladins	PES 2019	Street Fighter V

=== Esports titles to be played at 2021 High School LAN Provincial and National Championships ===
Saturday	Clash Royale	FIFA 19	Paladins	PES 2019
Sunday	CounterStrike: GO	Dota 2	League of Legends	Street Fighter V

== State awards ==
- In 2002, David Hlophe received the President's Award (Silver Class) from the President, Mr Thabo Mbeki, at the President's residence in Cape Town.
- In 2003, Rhonnie Manana and Thabo Mokoena were finalists at the South African Sports Awards.
- In 2007, Berneice Ligault and Amanda Kwaza were also finalists at the South African Sports Awards.
- in 2013, Simphiwe Maphumulo was the recipient of the Indigenous Sports Star of the Year award at the S A Sports Awards.

== Other awards ==
- In 2005, Colin Webster was a recipient of the Ekuhurleni Outstanding Sports Administrator Award
- In 2010, Barry Booysen was a recipient of the Ekuhurleni Volunteer of the Year Award
- In 2013, Morizane Boyes was the recipient of the Volunteer of the Year Award at the Spar GSport Awards
- In 2014, Lubabalo Kondlo was a finalist in the Eastern Cape Provincial Sportsman of the Year Awards
- In 2014, Kyle Wolmarans was a finalist in the Eastern Cape Provincial Media Person of the Year Awards

== Management Board Awards ==
Year	Mind Sports Person of the Year	Board Gamer of the Year	Esports Gamer of the Year	Wargamer of the Year	Volunteer of the Year	Writer of the Year	Sponsor of the Year	Umpire of the year	Social Media Person of the Year	Coach of the Year	Team of the Year	Educator of the Year
2009	Colin Webster	Mothusi Moabi	Stephen White	Edward van Trotsenburg	Ryan van den Bergh	Muhammed Nagdee	Incredible Connection					
2010	Frans Brewis	Simphiwe Maphumulo	Nialle Momsen	Gregory Laycock	Ryan van den Bergh	Jaco Diedericks	Incredible Connection					
2011	Jaco Engelbrecht	Lubabalo Kondlo	Robert Botha	David Vannucci	Ryan van den Bergh	Alexandra Kayle	ASUS					
2012	Robert Botha	Simphiwe Maphumulo	Gabriela Isaacs	Eugene Burger	Louis Brown	Han Cilliers	GIGABYTE					
2013	Simphiwe Maphumulo	Simphiwe Maphumulo	Lyrene Kuhn	Colin Webster	Dorian Love	Han Ciliiers	MWEB					
2014	Morizan Boyes	Lubabalo Kondlo	Barry West	Elishia Retief	Louis Brown	Kyle Wolmarans	MWEB					
2015	Elishia Retief	Lubabalo Kondlo	Kyle Turnbull	Jason Batzofin	Morizane Boyes	Andrew Rose of My Community	MWEB					
2016	Jason Batzofin	Lucille Brown	Matthew Smith	Garth Schoeman	Colin Webster	Tamzyn Pamplin of MyComLink	SterKinekor					
2017	Adele Janse Van Rensburg	Cassandra van Tonder	Mxolisi Lukhele	Terence Allwright	Alwyn van Wyk	Tamzyn Pamplin of MyComLink	TULUNTULU					
2018	Jessie Joubert	Chanel De Wet	Marisa van Der Westhuizen	Terence Allwright	Johan van Breda	Tamzyn Pamplin My Comlink	TULUNTULU					
2019	Dr. Janine Brand	Saudah Bhaimia	Terrance Broomberg	Angellah Sulamoyo	Christiaan Botes	Jermain Craig Saturday Star	TULUNTULU	Johan van Breda	Riaan Vrey	Jessie Joubert	ZAG Paladins	Gary Blieden
2020	Johan van Breda	Saudah Bhaimia	Rafeeq Cariem	Colin Webster	Johan van Breda	AWSUM NEWS	ZAG Academy	Jessie Joubert	Barry Bridges	Jessie Joubert	PES Society	Diana Barnard
2021	Jonathan Brown	Saudah Bhaimia	Jonathan Brown	Colin Webster	Johan van Breda	AWSUM NEWS	North West University (NWU)	Anneke Lourens Luies	Barry Bridges	Jessie Joubert	ZAG DotA	Anneke Lourens Luies
2022	Johan van Breda	Saudah Bhaimia	Bernice Botha	Colin Webster	Anneke Lourens Luies	AWSUM NEWS	North West University (NWU)	Jessie Joubert	Colin Webster	Jessie Joubert	CSGO and Dota - Curro Lonehill	Desiree Botha
2023	Anneke Lourens Luies	Suimphiwe Maphumulo	Mohammed Rido Hendericks	No award	Anneke Lourens Luies	Germiston News	North West University (NWU)	Anneke Lourens Luies	MyComlink	Armand van der Colf	Mikara Nokraj	Desiree Botha
2024	Jessica Greef	No award	Jessica Greef	Terry Allwright	Johan van Breda	Alicia Pillay	North West University	Armand van der Colf	Colin Webster	Amirali Zahedi	Female CSGO Team	Tiaan Lotter

== World champions produced ==
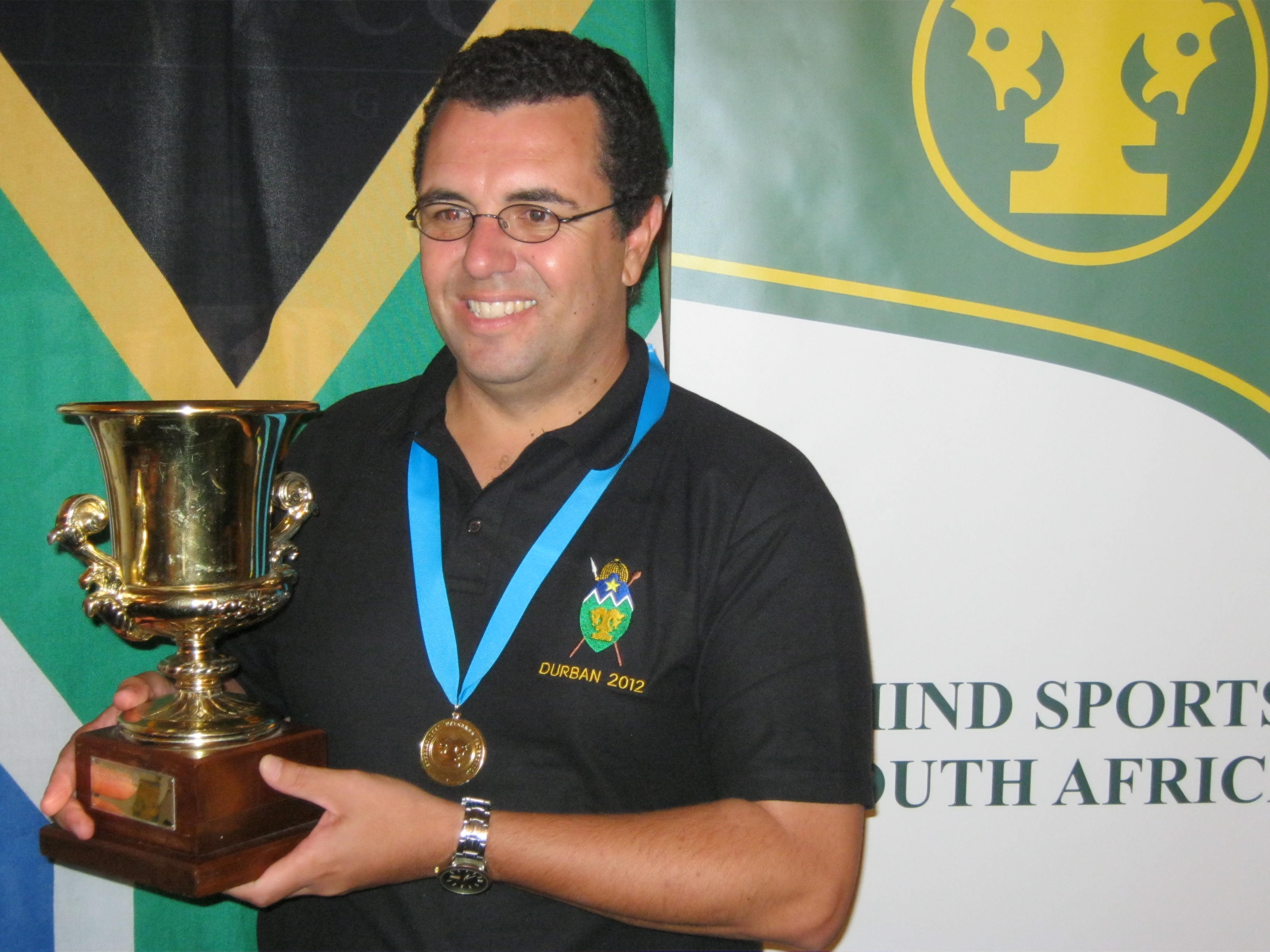
Eugene Burger receiving trophy

South Africa has produced the following world champions:

Period	Year	Name	Member Club
Ancients – Senior	2012	Eugene Burger	Maritzburg Christian School Wargames Club
	2013	Colin Webster	Old Edwardian Wargames Club
	2014	Colin Webster	Old Edwardian Wargames Club
	2015	Colin Webster	Old Edwardian Wargames Club
Ancients – women	2006	Bernice Ligault	Old Edwardian Wargames Club
	2007	Bernice Ligault	Old Edwardian Wargames Club
	2014	Elishia Retief	Old Edwardian Wargames Club
	2015	Elishia Retief	Old Edwardian Wargames Club
Ancients – Junior males	2000	Andre Tonkin	Krugersdorp High School
	2001	Matthew Strachan	Old Edwardian Wargames Club
	2002	Benjamin Shulman	Old Edwardian Wargames Club
	2003	Angelo Stathoussis	Peninsula Wargames Group
	2004	Angelo Stathoussis	Peninsula Wargames Group
	2005	Angelo Stathoussis	Peninsula Wargames Group
	2009	Duane Havenga	Pretoria Boys High School
	2010	Gregory Laycock	Pretoria Boys High School
	2012	Gregory Laycock	Pretoria Boys High School
	2013	Adam Louw	Pretoria Boys High School
	2014	Jason Batzofin	St John's College
	2014	Jason Batzofin	St John's College
eSports – mobile games	2005	Logan Brooke-Smith	Exactmobile
Morabaraba – Senior	1997	Gilbert Magabotse	Spoornet Morabaraba Club
	1999	Amos Mavuso	Spoornet Morabaraba Club
	2000	David Hlophe	Spoornet Morabaraba Club
	2001	David Hlophe	Leandra Giant Killers
	2002	Simon Skhosana	Leandra Giant Killers
	2003	Simphiwe Maphumulo	Alexandra High School
	2007	Moses Rannyadi	Impala Plats.
	2012	Simphiwe Maphumulo	Pietermaritzburg Morabaraba Club
	2013	Simphiwe Maphumulo	Zola Checkers Club
Morabaraba – Junior	2002	Innocent Khubeka	Leandra Giant Killers
	2003	Simphiwe Maphumulo	Alexandra High School
	2005	Teresa Chen	Maritzburg Girl's High
	2007	Innocent Khubeka	Leandra Giant Killers
Pike & Shot – Senior	2002	Edward van Trotsenburg	Technikon Witwatersrand
	2009	Edward van Trotsenburg	Bedfordview Mind Sports Club

== Medal winners ==
South Africa has produced the following medal winners in international championships:

Period	Year	Position	Event	Name	Member Club
Ancients – Senior	2015	1st	IWF World Championships	Colin Webster	Old Edwardian Wargames Club
	2014	1st	IWF World Championships	Colin Webster	Old Edwardian Wargames Club
	2014	2nd	IWF World Championships	Ewan Retief	Old Edwardian Wargames Club
	2013	1st	IWF World Championships	Colin Webster	Old Edwardian Wargames Club
	2012	1st	IWF World Championships	Eugene Burger	Maritzburg Christian School Wargames Club
	2012	3rd	IWF World Championships	Jason van Wyngaard	Old Edwardian Wargames Club
	2010	3rd	IWF World Championships	Colin Webster	Old Edwardian Wargames Club
	2004	1st	IWF African Continental Championships	Colin Webster	Old Edwardian Wargames Club
	2004	2nd	IWF African Continental Championships	Richard Ligault	Old Edwardian Wargames Club
	2004	3rd	IWF African Continental Championships	Ingo Haferung	Old Edwardian Wargames Club
	2002	2nd	IWF World Championships	Andre Tonkin	Krugersdorp High School
Ancients – females	2015	1st	IWF World Championships	Elishia Retief	Old Edwardian Wargames Club
	2014	1st	IWF World Championships	Elishia Retief	Old Edwardian Wargames Club
	2007	1st	IWF World Championships	Bernice Ligault	Old Edwardian Wargames Club
	2006	1st	IWF World Championships	Bernice Ligault	Old Edwardian Wargames Club
Ancients – Junior	2015	1st	IWF World Championships	Jason Batzofin	St John's College
	2014	1st	IWF World Championships	Jason Batzofin	St John's College
	2013	1st	IWF World Championships	Adam Louw	Pretoria Boys High School
	2012	1st	IWF World Championships	Gregory Laycock	Pretoria Boys High School
	2010	1st	IWF World Championships	Gregory Laycock	Pretoria Boys High School
	2009	1st	IWF World Championships	Duane Havenga	Pretoria Boys High School
	2006	1st	IWF World Championships	Angelo Stathoussis	Peninsula Wargames Group
	2006	2nd	IWF World Championships	Pierre Lotter	Paul Roos Gimnasium
	2005	1st	IWF World Championships	Angelo Stathoussis	Peninsula Wargames Group
	2004	1st	IWF World Championships	Angelo Stathoussis	Peninsula Wargames Group
	2003	1st	IWF World Championships	Angelo Stathoussis	Peninsula Wargames Group
	2002	1st	IWF World Championships	Benjamin Shulman	Old Edwardian Wargames Club
	2001	1st	IWF World Championships	Matthew Strachan	Old Edwardian Wargames Club
	2000	1st	IWF World Championships	Andre Tonkin	Krugersdorp High School
Checkers	2012	2nd	SportAccord World Mind Games	Lubabalo Kondlo	Dr Niederhoffer Memorial Draughts Club
eSports – mobile games	2005	1st	World Cyber Games	Logan Brooke-Smith	Exactmobile
eSports – PC	2011	2nd	IeSMoD World Championships	Jacobus Engelbrecht	Worcester Gaming Club
	2012	2nd	IeSF World Championships	Gabriela Isaacs	SAHETI School
	2024	1st	African Esports Championships (AEC)	Female CounterStrike GO	ATK Gaming
	2024	2nd	African Esports Championships (AEC)	Male CounterStrike GO	ZAG Academy
Morabaraba – Senior	1997	1st	IWF World Championships	Gilbert Magabotse	Spoornet Morabaraba Club
	1999	1st	IWF World Championships	Amos Mavuso	Spoornet Morabaraba Club
	2000	1st	IWF World Championships	David Hlophe	Spoornet Morabaraba Club
	2001	1st	IWF World Championships	David Hlophe	Leandra Giant Killers
	2002	1st	IWF World Championships	Simon Skhosana	Leandra Giant Killers
	2003	1st	IWF World Championships	Simphiwe Maphumulo	Alexandra High School
	2007	1st	IWF World Championships	Moses Rannyadi	Impala Plats.
	2007	1st	IWF World Championships	Ledile Tshwane	University of Johannesburg
	2007	2nd	IWF World Championships	Amanda Kwaza	University of Johannesburg
	2012	1st	IWF World Championships	Simphiwe Maphumulo	Pietermaritzburg Morabaraba Club
	2013	1st	IWF World Championships	Simphiwe Maphumulo	Zola Checkers Club
Morabaraba – Junior	2002	1st	IWF World Championships	Innocent Khubeka	Leandra Giant Killers
	2003	1st	IWF World Championships	Simphiwe Maphumulo	Alexandra High School
	2005	1st	IWF World Championships	Teresa Chen	Maritzburg Girl's High
	2007	1st	IWF World Championships	Innocent Khubeka	Leandra Giant Killers
Pike & Shot – Senior	2002	1st	IWF World Championships	Edward van Trotsenburg	Technikon Witwatersrand
	2009	1st	IWF World Championships	Edward van Trotsenburg	Bedfordview Mind Sports Club

== World Championships attended ==
Year	Venue	Disciplines
1991 to 1996	Derby – United Kingdom	Wargames
1997	Johannesburg – South Africa	Morabaraba, wargames
1999	Cape Town – South Africa	Morabaraba, wargames
2000	Epsom – United Kingdom	Morabaraba, wargames
2001	Epsom – United Kingdom	Morabaraba, wargames
2002	Durban – South Africa	Morabaraba, wargames
2003	Rome – Italy	Morabaraba, wargames
2004	New Orleans – United States	Morabaraba, wargames
2004	Palapye – Botswana	Morabaraba
2005	Athens – Greece	Morabaraba, wargames
2005	Seoul – South Korea	Esports
2006	Melbourne – Australia	Morabaraba, wargames
2006	Taipei – Taiwan	Esports
2007	Port Elizabeth – South Africa	Morabaraba, wargames
2007	Seattle – United States	Esports
2008	Helsinki – Finland	Morabaraba, wargames
2008	Johannesburg – South Africa	Esports
2009	Busan – South Korea	Esports
2009	New York – United States	Esports
2009	Taebaek – South Korea	Esports
2009	Washington – United States	Morabaraba, wargames
2010	Athens – Greece	Morabaraba, wargames
2010	Daegu – South Korea	Esports
2010	New York – United States	Esports
2011	Andong – South Korea	Esports
2011	Wellington – New Zealand	Morabaraba, wargames
2012	Cheonan – South Korea	Esports
2012	Durban – South Africa	Morabaraba, wargames
2013	Bucharest – Romania	Esports
2013	Pretoria – South Africa	Morabaraba, wargames
2014	Baku – Azerbaijan	Esports
2014	Maseru – Lesotho	Morabaraba, wargames
2015	Mbabane – Swaziland	Morabaraba, wargames
2015	Seoul – South Korea	Esports
2015	Wales – Wales	Checkers
2016	Jakarta – Indonesia	Esports
2017	Busan – South Korea	Esports
2018	Kaohsiung – Taiwan	Esports
2019	Seoul – South Korea	Esports
2020	Eilat – Israel cancelled due to COVID-19	Esports
2020	Johannesburg – South Africa cancelled due to COVID-19	Morabaraba and Wargames
2021	Eilat – Israel	Esports
2022	Bali – Indonesia	Esports
2023	Iasi – Romania	Esports

== Official Ranking after IeSF World Championships ==
Year	Venue	Position
2011	Andong – South Korea	13th
2012	Cheonan – South Korea	18th
2013	Bucharest – Romania	10th
2014	Baku – Azerbaijan	13th
2015	Seoul – South Korea	12th
2016	Jakarta – Indonesia	14th
2017	Busan – South Korea	12th
2018	Kaohsiung City – Taiwan	20th
2019	Seoul – South Korea	
2020	Eilat – Israel Cancelled due to COVID-19	Not Applicable

== Official eSports Tri-Nation Test matches ==
The following online events were held by member associations and under the jurisdiction of the IeSF:

Year	Date	Countries	Title played	Result
2013	12 October 2013	Denmark, Israel, South Africa	League of Legends	4, 2, 0

== Official Test matches ==
The following Test matches were held:

Year	Date	Countries	Title played	Result
1994	28 September 1994	England, South Africa	Ancients	768–2375
1994	29 September 1994	United Kingdom, South Africa	Ancients	440–1565
1996	2 October 1996	England, South Africa	Ancients	1085–385
1998	15 October 1998	United Kingdom, South Africa	Ancients	77–49
1999	30 September 1999	United Kingdom, South Africa	Ancients	84–42
2000	8 April 2000	United Kingdom, South Africa	Ancients	85–41
2001	5 April 2001	Italy, South Africa	Ancients	1–95
2001	5 April 2001	United Kingdom, South Africa	Ancients	112–14
2001	6 April 2001	United States, South Africa	Ancients	46–80
2002	19 February 2002	United Kingdom, South Africa	Ancients	68–58
2003	10 March 2003	United Kingdom, South Africa	Ancients	100–26
2003	6 March 2003	United States, South Africa	Ancients	92–34
2005	21 April 2005	United Kingdom, South Africa	Ancients	80–46
2005	22 April 2005	Australia, South Africa	Ancients	64–62
2006	13 April 2006	Finland, South Africa	Ancients	24–102
2006	14 April 2006	Greece, South Africa	Ancients	46–80
2008	6 December 2008	Sweden, South Africa	DotA	2–0
2010	16 April	Greece, South Africa	Ancients	60–68
2010	8 December 2010	Namibia, South Africa	Call of Duty 4	0–1
2010	8 December 2010	Namibia, South Africa	FIFA '10	0–2
2013	31 July 2013	Romania, South Africa	DotA 2	1–0
2013	31 March 2013	Romania, South Africa	StarCraft II	2–0
2013	8 September 2013	Mexico, South Africa	DotA 2	0–1
2014	25 October 2014	Namibia, South Africa	Dota 2	0–2
2014	4 October 2014	Finland, South Africa	DotA 2	2–0
2014	4 October 2014	Finland, South Africa	StarCraft II	2–0
2014	8 August 2014	Egypt, South Africa	DotA 2	2–0
2015	11 July 2015	Austria, South Africa	FIFA '15	6–0
2015	13 August 2015	Tunisia, South Africa	CounterStrike: GO	1–0
2015	13 August 2015	Egypt, South Africa	CounterStrike: GO	1–0
2015	14 August 2015	Algeria, South Africa	CounterStrike: GO	1–0
2015	14 August 2015	Libya, South Africa	CounterStrike: GO	1–0
2015	14 November 2015	Israel, South Africa	League of Legends	2–0
2015	27 March 2015	South Africa, Zimbabwe	FIFA '15	2–0
2015	4 December 2015	Finland, South Africa	StarCraft II: LotV	2–0
2016	6 February 2016	Ghana, South Africa	FIFA'16	5–1
2016	9 October 2016	Egypt, South Africa	HearthStone	1–1
2017	16 September 2017	Tunisia, South Africa	League of Legends	2–0
2017	30 July 2017	Namibia, South Africa	FIFA '17	1–0
2017	9 September 2017	Switzerland, South Africa	CounterStrike: GO, League of Legends, Tekken 7	2–0, 2–0, 1–0
2018	17 March 2018	Ghana, South Africa	FIFA'18 and Tekken 7	3–1, 2–2
2018	23 June 2018	Namibia, South Africa	Tekken 7 (Male), Tekken 7 (Female), FIFA'18	0–2, 0–1, 1–1
2018	28 August 2018	Russia, South Africa	Tekken 7 (Male), Counter-Strike: GO	1–0, 1–0
2020	16 May 2020	Azerbaijan, South Africa	DotA 2	2–0
2020	25 April 2020	South Africa, Namibia	DotA 2	2–0
2020	25 October 2020	South Africa, Namibia	PES 2020	2–0
2020	25 October 2020	South Africa, Namibia	DotA 2	0–2
2020	6 May 2020	South Africa, Peru	DotA 2	0–2
2024	13	South Africa, Kenya	DotA 2	2–0
2024	14	South Africa, Namibia	DotA 2	2–0
2024	15	South Africa, Madagascar	DotA 2	2–0

== IESF Good governance ranking ==
Year	Position
2017	1st
2018	1st
2019	3rd
2020	Not published

== Committee members ==
MSSA has had the following committee members for the period 2005 to present:

Year	President	1st VP	2nd VP	3rd VP	General Secretary	Board Games Rep	eSports Rep	Wargames Rep	Women's Desk	Athlete's Rep	National Schools Director	Differently Abled Rep	Legal Rep			
2005	Colin Webster	Garth Schoeman	Richard Gordon	Thembile Nqezo	Richard Ligault	Rhonnie Manana	Rob Stevens	Kyle Banger	Ruth Davey	Vacant	Vacant	vacant	Carl Holliday			
2006	Colin Webster	Garth Schoeman	Richard Gordon	Thembile Nqezo	Richard Ligault	Rhonnie Manana	Johann von Backström	Kyle Banger	Ledile Tshwane	Amanda Kwaza	Vacant	vacant	Carl Holliday			
2007	Colin Webster	Garth Schoeman	Lloyd Clark	Thembile Nqezo	Richard Ligault	Rhonnie Manana	Johann von Backström	Bobby Stathoussis	Ledile Tshwane	Amanda Kwaza	Vacant	vacant	Carl Holliday			
2008	Colin Webster	Garth Schoeman	Lloyd Clark	vacant	Richard Ligault	vacant	Johann von Backström	Bobby Stathoussis	Ledile Tshwane	Amanda Kwaza	Vacant	vacant	Carl Holliday			
2009	Colin Webster	Garth Schoeman	Lloyd Clark	vacant	vacant	Gavin Penkin	Dr Ryan van den Bergh	Bobby Stathoussis	vacant	Vacant	Vacant	vacant	Carl Holliday			
2010	Colin Webster	Garth Schoeman	Dr David Vannucci	vacant	vacant	Gavin Penkin	Dr Ryan van den Bergh	Donald Mullany	vacant	Jonathan Newman	vacant	vacant	Carl Holliday			
2011	Colin Webster	Garth Schoeman	Dr David Vannucci	Motsotsi Thipe	vacant	Gavin Penkin	Dr Ryan van den Bergh	Donald Mullany	vacant	Vacant	Vacant	vacant	Carl Holliday			
2012	Colin Webster	Garth Schoeman	Dr David Vannucci	Motsotsi Thipe	vacant	Gavin Penkin	David Webster	Donald Mullany	vacant	Vacant	Dorian Love	vacant	Carl Holliday			
2013	Colin Webster	Garth Schoeman	Ewan Retief	Motsotsi Thipe	vacant	Gavin Penkin	David Webster	Donald Mullany	vacant	Vacant	Dorian Love	vacant	Carl Holliday			
2014	Simphiwe Maphumulo	Garth Schoeman	Ewan Retief	vacant	Colin Webster	vacant	Ryan Boyes	Donald Mullany	Morizane Boyes	Vacant	Elize Crouse	vacant	Carl Holliday			
2015	Simphiwe Maphumulo	Garth Schoeman	Ewan Retief	James Evans	Colin Webster	vacant	Ryan Boyes	Donald Mullany	Morizane Boyes	vacant	vacant	vacant	Carl Holliday			
2016	Simphiwe Maphumulo	Leonard Loftus	Sheraaz Nunnian	James Evans	Colin Webster	vacant	Ryan Boyes	Sean Barry	Morizane Boyes	Jason Batzofin	vacant	vacant	Carl Holliday			
Year	President	Executive Officer	Executive Officer	Executive Officer	Executive Officer	Executive Officer	General Secretary	Board Games Rep	Card Games Rep	eSports Rep	Wargames Rep	Women's Desk	Athlete's Rep	National Schools Director	Differently Abled Rep	Legal Rep
2017	Morizane Boyes	James Evans	vacant	Adele Janse van Rensburg	Sheraaz Nunnian	n/a	Colin Webster	Joseph Matlhong	Paula Loftus	Ryan Boyes	vacant	Blair Hamberger	Jason Batzofin	Tyrone Green	Twane Tollemache	Carl Holliday
2018	Amanda Phakade, Morizane Boyes (Resigned)	James Evans	Johan van Breda	Adele Janse van Rensburg	Sheraaz Nunnian	Leonard Loftus	Colin Webster	Joseph Matlhong	Paula Loftus	Ryan Boyes	Terence Allwright	Blair Hamberger	Jason Batzofin	Darryl-Lee Bruce-Smith	Twane Tollemache	Carl Holliday
2019	Amanda Phakade	Johan van Breda	Annabela Joubert	Garth Schoeman		Leonard Loftus	Colin Webster	Joseph Matlhong	Paula Loftus	Marisa van der Westhuizen	Terence Allwright	Dr Janine Brandt	Amone Bekker		Twane Tollemache	Carl Holliday
Year	President	Vice President	Executive Officer	Executive Officer	Executive Officer	Executive Officer	General Secretary	Board Games Rep	Card Games Rep	eSports Rep	Wargames Rep	Women's Desk	Athlete's Rep	National Schools Director	Differently Abled Rep	Legal Rep
2020	Amanda Phakade	Johan van Breda (Acting)	Annabela Joubert	vacant	vacant	vacant	Colin Webster	vacant	vacant	Marisa van der Westhuizen	Terence Allwright	Dr Janine Brandt	vacant	vacant	Twane Tollemache	Carl Holliday
2021	Amanda Phakade	Johan van Breda	Annabela Joubert	Simon Zandstra	vacant	vacant	Colin Webster	vacant	vacant	Marisa van der Westhuizen	Terence Allwright	Marisa Joubert	Jessie Joubert	Anneke Lourens	vacant	Terence Allwright
2022	Colin Webster	Johan van Breda	vacant	Simon Zandstra	vacant	vacant	vacant	vacant	vacant	vacant	Terence Allwright	Marisa Joubert	Jessie Joubert	Anneke Lourens	vacant	vacant
2023	Colin Webster	Johan van Breda	TBD	Simon Zandstra	TBD	vacant	TBD	TBD	TBD	vacant	Terence Allwright	Marisa Joubert	Jessie Joubert	Anneke Lourens	vacant	TBD

== South Africans who have served on international committees ==
The following South Africans have served on international committees:

Year	Name	Position	Body
2008–2011	Dr David Vannucci	Vice-president (Africa)	International Wargames Federation (IWF)
2013–2020	Colin Webster	Management Board	International e-Sports Federation (IeSF)
2016–2020	Jason Batzofin	Athlete's Commission	International e-Sports Federation (IeSF)
2018-2020	Colin Webster	President	International e-Sports Federation (IeSF)
2018-present	Amanda Kwaza	Vice President	Confederation of African Esports (CAES)
2018-present	Johan van Breda	Board Member	Confederation of African Esports (CAES)
2021–present	Colin Webster	Member of GEF Education, Culture, Youth Commission	Global Esports Federation (GEF)

== Affiliations to international federations ==
Mind Sport South Africa is affiliated to the following international federations:

- Global Esports Federation
- International eSports Federation
- International Wargames Federation
- World Draughts Federation FMJD
- Confederation of African Esports CAES

== See also ==
- International Wargames Federation
