= Bonus Socius =

13th century manuscript

Bonus Socius (Latin for "a jolly good fellow") is a medieval treatise on chess, trictrac (medieval tables) and merels. The exact date of writing is not known, but it is dated to the second half of the 13th century. Bonus Socius was written in Latin in Lombardy by an anonymous author. It has been translated into several dialects of French, German and Italian.

Bonus Socius is an encyclopedia that compiles problems from older sources. It was created as a compendium of all known chess problems. It is one of two main chess encyclopedias of that time, together with Civis Bononiae, also created in Lombardy. Their themes and problems partly coincide; in some parts of the books the problems are even given in the same order, although their solutions are mostly different.

An Italian manuscript copy is kept in the National Central Library in Florence (MS. Nat. Lib. Florence, Banco dei Rari, B. A. 6, p. 2, No. 1). It has 119 pages in quarto with 194 chess problems, 24 merels problems and 11 trictrac problems, written two per page. The problems are ordered by number of moves before checkmate.

== Sources ==
- Karpov, Anatoly, ed. (1990). Шахматы: энциклопедический словарь [Chess: encyclopedic dictionary]. Moscow: Sovetskaya Entsiklopediya. p. 43. ISBN 5-85270-005-3.
- Murray, H. J. R. (1913). A History of Chess. Oxford University Press. pp. 618–642. ISBN 0-19-827403-3.
- Walker, Damian Gareth (2014). A Book of Historic Board Games. Lulu.com. p. 98. ISBN 978-1-326-06695-6.
