= Esports World Federation =

Esports governing body in the Philippines

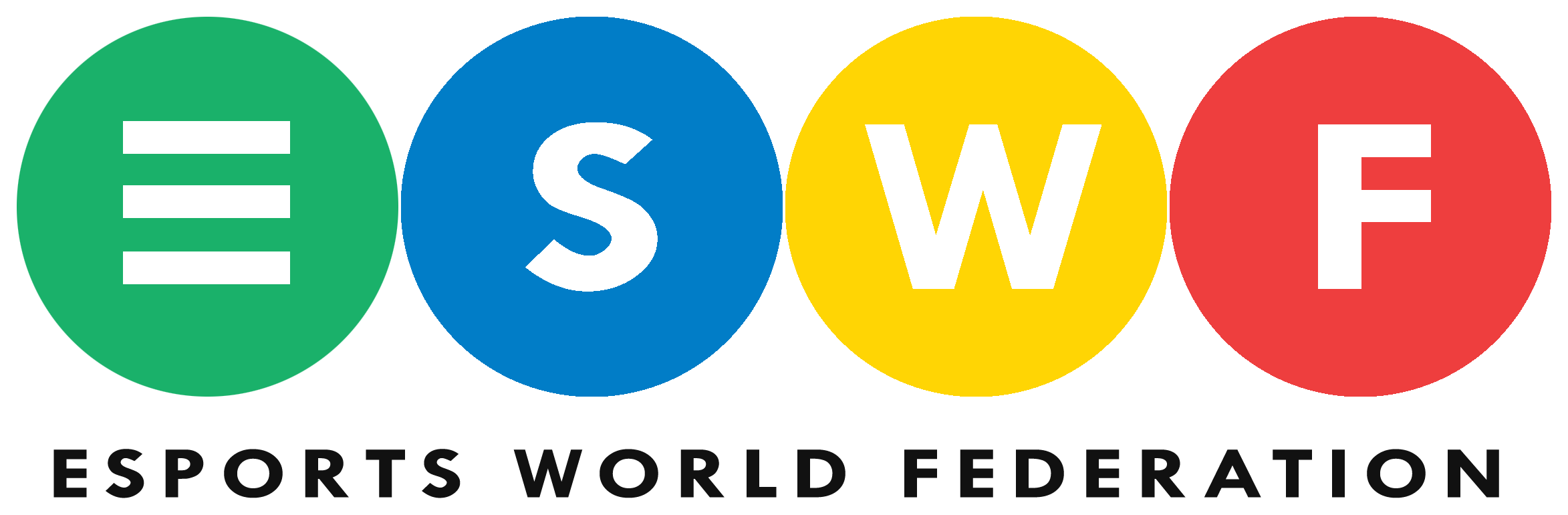
- Abbreviation: ESWF
- Formation: 2018
- Type: Sports federation
- Headquarters: Manila, Philippines
- Official language: English
- President: Arniel Gutierrez
- Main organ: General Assembly
- Website: eswf.games

The Esports World Federation (EWSF) is a Philippine-based international organization that serves as an umbrella body for international federations in electronic sports (esports) and digital sports and other game genres across the world.

Founded in 2018, the federation's mission is to declare the Philippines as a center of esports in the country, to being the sole governing body of esports in the world and to support the game developers, software companies and players who are participating in the events being run by ESWF.

According to its website, the strategic plan of the federation is to encourage and support the formation of international esport genre governing bodies, holding World Cup for Esports once every two years and World Championships yearly, holding the esports summit, training and certification coaches for those who are interested in the sport. EWSF has also partnered with Philippine-based collegiate sports leagues the Federation of School Sports Associations of the Philippines, the Philippine Collegiate Champions League and the Philippine Inter Schools, Colleges and Universities Athletic Association and international federations in executing their plans, among them is the strengthening of the grassroots program and school-based tournaments.

In 2021, ESWF signed a memorandum of understanding with the International Esports Federation for the unification of all esports organizations and the development of the sport through the esports For All Commission.

== Members ==
- Amateur Europe Esports Federation
- Americas Esports Federation Organization
- Asia Pacific Electronic Sports Confederation
- Digital Cock Boxing
- Esports World Federation Pan American
- International Digital Invasion Confederation
- International Digital Motor Sports Federation
- International Federation of Esports and Digital Sports University
- International Federation of Esports Battle Royale
- International Federation of Esports Coaches
- International Federation of Esports FPS
- International Federation of Esports Fighting Game KO
- International Federation of Esports Healthcare Professionals
- International Federation of Esports MOBA
- International Federation of Esports RTS
- International Federation of Esports – Mmorpg
- ESports Career and Pathways
- Organization of African Electronic Sports
- World Digital Combat Sports Federation
- YeSports Asia
