= Dana Medeuova =

Kazakh entrepreneur and politician (born 1978)

MP Dana Medeuova
- Дана Медеуова

Member of the Kurultai
- Incumbent
- Assumed office 27 August 2026
- Party list: Ädilet

Personal details
- Born: Dana Temırtaiqyzy Izbastina; 11 September 1978 (age 48)
- Party: Ädilet (since 2026)
- Children: 1
- Parent: Temirtai Izbastin (father)
- Relatives: Kassym-Jomart Tokayev (uncle)
- Website: Official biography

Dana Temırtaiqyzy Medeuova (Note: Often transliterated as Dana Temirtaevna Medeuova through a Russified Romanization of Дана Темиртаевна Медеуова.) (Note: Kazakh: Дана Теміртайқызы Медеуова) (née Izbastina; born 11 September 1978) is a Kazakh academic, entrepreneur and public figure serving as the member of the 1st Kurultai since 2026. She is the daughter of diplomat Temirtai Izbastin and niece of 2nd president of Kazakhstan Kassym-Jomart Tokayev.

== Early life ==
Dana Temırtaiqyzy Izbastina was born on 11 September 1978 as the eldest child of diplomat Temirtai Izbastin and Qarlyğa Izbastina (née Tokayeva), sister of Kazakh president Kassym-Jomart Tokayev.

The Russian outlet IStories reported that Qarlyğa Izbastina once held Russian citizenship, owned a now‑inactive travel agency in Germany called Dana Reiseservice, and defended a doctoral dissertation at the Diplomatic Academy of the Russian Ministry of Foreign Affairs, from which Kassym‑Jomart Tokayev also graduated.

== Public service ==
In 2000, Dana Medeuova worked at Abai Almaty State University as a trainee-researcher in the Department of International Relations. In 2002, she moved to Al-Farabi Kazakh National University as a senior lecturer in the Department of International Journalism.

On 27 December 2004 Medeuova successfully defended dissertation titled "Mass Media of the Republic of Kazakhstan in the Formation and Development of Political Processes in the Context of Globalization" and received a Doctor of Political Sciences degree.

In 2006, Medeuova was awarded the academic title of associate professor in political science and became a corresponding member of the Academy of Sciences in political science.

In 2008, Medeuova returned to Abai State University, which had been renamed Abai Kazakh National Pedagogical University, and served as vice-rector for international relations until 2012. At the same time she was a professor in the Department of Political Science and Socio-Economic Disciplines at the Institute of Master's and PhD Studies of university.

Also in 2008, she participated in a practical seminar organized by the American non-governmental organization Legacy International on "Responsible Governance, Civic Education, and Citizen Participation in the Development of a Democratic Society."

In 2010, she was appointed chair of the Abai Kazakh National Pedagogical University dissertation council for the specialties "Philosophy of Science and Technology", "Religious Studies, Philosophical Anthropology, Philosophy of Culture", and "Political Institutions, Ethnopolitical Conflictology, National and Political Processes and Technologies."

In 2017, Medeuova unveiled a stele in honor of her grandfather, Kemel Tokayev, in the Karatal District of Almaty Region.

On 7 May 2026, she joined the newly founded party Adilet at its founding congress. In the Kurultai elections held on 23 August 2026, the Adilet secured a majority of votes. On 27 August, the Central Election Commission registered Dana Medeuova as a member of the 1st Kurultai.

Medeuova did not run a public election campaign, so before the Kurultai convened her appearance and biography were largely unknown to the public. At the Kurultai opening, when she took the oath live on air, she was briefly shown from a distance for about two seconds before the broadcast switched to a wide shot of the hall, other deputies were shown for longer and more closely. On the morning of 1 September journalists from Radio Liberty found that Medeuova's page had disappeared from the official Kurultai website. After their inquiry the Kurultai press service said the removal was due to a technical error during a data update, and her page was promptly restored. When media and the public considered her to be private and reclusive, Medeuova unexpectedly opened an Instagram account and revealed herself on 15 September.

== Business activity ==
In 2014, Medeuova registered a sole proprietorship "MEDEUOVA D.T." through which geological exploration was conducted, including at the Ermaksu gold mine in Turkistan Region. In 2021, the company's income reportedly reached 56 billion tenge and the business was closed. In the same year two art galleries named "Sal Seri" were registered in Astana; the founders were listed as Bagdat Omirzhanova and Medeuova.

When Kassym-Jomart Tokayev served as the foreign minister from 2002 to 2007, his sister Qarlyğa Izbastina purchased the Foreign Ministry Reception House in Almaty for 280 million tenge and owned it through the company Meerbusch. Later Medeuova herself became one of the founders. According to available records, the Reception House is now owned by Rahimbek Tasbolatov, who is not connected to the Izbastin or Tokayev families.

At the time of her registration as a member of the Kurultai, Medeuova was listed as manager of the children's development center "Funny School".

=== Bulgaria ===
Medeuova owned three companies — Dami Investment, Dami International, and SD Property Investments registered at the same address in Sofia. Her share in SD Property Investments was 74.91%. In 2017, she transferred nearly €700,000 from her personal account to that company, and the company later purchased a plot in western Sofia that remained undeveloped. On 22 May 2024 she left the company.

Medeuova became the sole owner of Dami Investment in 2018, but on 9 May 2024 control of the company passed to Marina Kolovski, who renamed it CREA VISION.

=== Czech Republic ===
In the Czech Republic, Medeuova and her brother Beket Izbastin owned companies Abi Construction Capital and BG Invest Capital, which managed rental properties, but now both companies were inactive.

== Criticism ==
In 2010, Medeuova's colleague at Abai Kazakh National Pedagogical University Sağdat Ädilbekov accused her of plagiarism, claiming that her dissertation had been copied word for word from a study by the Russian scholar Natalia Urina of Moscow State University. He also questioned the legitimacy of Medeuova's rapid career advancement, noting that no traces of a prior candidate's (PhD equivalent) dissertation could be found in the country's academic library records, and suggesting her success was linked to support from a high-ranking relative.

== Personal life ==
Minister of Science and Higher Education of Kazakhstan Saiasat Nurbek, Minister of Tourism and Sports Erbol Myrzabosynov, Nurassyl Medeu, PM Oljas Bektenov, vice president of Mabetex Group Agim Pacolli and co-president Afrim Pacolli, July 3, 2026

Nurassyl Medeu, October 25, 2025

Her son, Nurasyl Medeu (born 2003), studied computer science at Boston University from 2020 to 2024. Despite studying abroad, at the age of 18 he founded the Academy of Physical Culture and Mass Sports, which was reorganized into the Kazakh National University of Sports in 2026. According to an investigation by Azattyq, Medeu holds a 95% stake in the university, while the remaining 5% is state-owned; notably, the entire infrastructure of the institution was built using state funds. In the same year, he founded the Qazaq AI Research University. Officially registered on April 10, 2026, the university is located at the Alem.AI international artificial intelligence hub in Astana, with Nurasyl Medeu retaining a 95% share and the state-owned company QazExpoCongress becoming the second co-founder with a 5% stake. In September 2026, he enrolled in a master's program in business administration at Fudan University in China. In December 2025, he was appointed Director of Development at the International Esports Federation.

Daughter, Nurai Medeuova, is a graduate of the Miras International School, Almaty and University of Edinburgh and an organizer of cultural initiatives focused on painting and abstract expressionism. Also, Nurai teaches visual arts at the Sal Seri gallery-studio, where she is director, the gallery's founder is Dana Medeuova.
