= Morabaraba =

Strategy board game played in Southern Africa

- Morabaraba gameboard; pieces move from intersection to intersection along marked lines
- Genres: Board game, abstract strategy game
- Players: 2
- Setup time: < 1 minute
- Playing time: < 1 hour
- Chance: None
- Age range: Any
- Skills: Strategy, tactics
- Synonyms: Mlabalaba, mmela, muravava, umlabalaba, mororova, meule

Morabaraba is a traditional two-player strategy board game played in South Africa and Botswana with a slightly different variation played in Lesotho. This game is known by many names in many languages, including mlabalaba, mmela (in Setswana), muravava and umlabalaba. The game is similar to twelve men's morris, a variation on the Roman board game nine men's morris, which was based on the Egyptian game. The earliest known diagram of Morabaraba was found in an Egyptian temple in Kurna, Egypt, dating back to around 1440 BC. Other boards have been discovered in Ceylon / Sri Lanka (c. AD 10).

While some believed that morabaraba was introduced to Southern Africa by British settlers, morris variants exist in many parts of the world, e.g., India (char bhar), Ghana (achi), Kenya (shisimia), Somalia (shax), Zimbabwe (tsoro yemutwelve), Iran(dooz), the Philippines (tapatan) and Mongolia (gurgaldaj). It is claimed that morabaraba boards carved in rock are dated to be at least 800 years old, which would exclude a European origin. As Nine Men's Morris and later 12, uses the term Men for the game pieces and Marabaraba uses the term "cows" for the stone pieces, both use the term "mill" for the line of three stones. It is reasonable that both games derived from the Egyptian game, one via the Roman and one directly.

Morabaraba is today most popular amongst rural African youth in Southern Africa, but can be seen daily at any non-city bus stop being played by adult passing time. In the traditional European games like nine men's morris, the counters are commonly referred to as "men", but in the South African game the counters are referred to as "cows", the game being particularly popular amongst youth who herd cattle.

According to the OxfordDictionaries.com, the term morabaraba is derived from the Southern Sotho moraba-raba, meaning 'to mill' or 'to go round in a circle'.

== Gameplay ==
Morabaraba is accessible and easy to learn, and games can be played quickly, but the strategic and tactical aspects of the game run deep. While it may be played on specially produced boards (or simulated by computer software as a video game), it is simple enough that a board can easily be scratched on a stone or into sand, with coins or pebbles (or whatever comes to hand) used as the pieces. The description below is compatible with Mind Sports South Africa's "generally accepted rules".

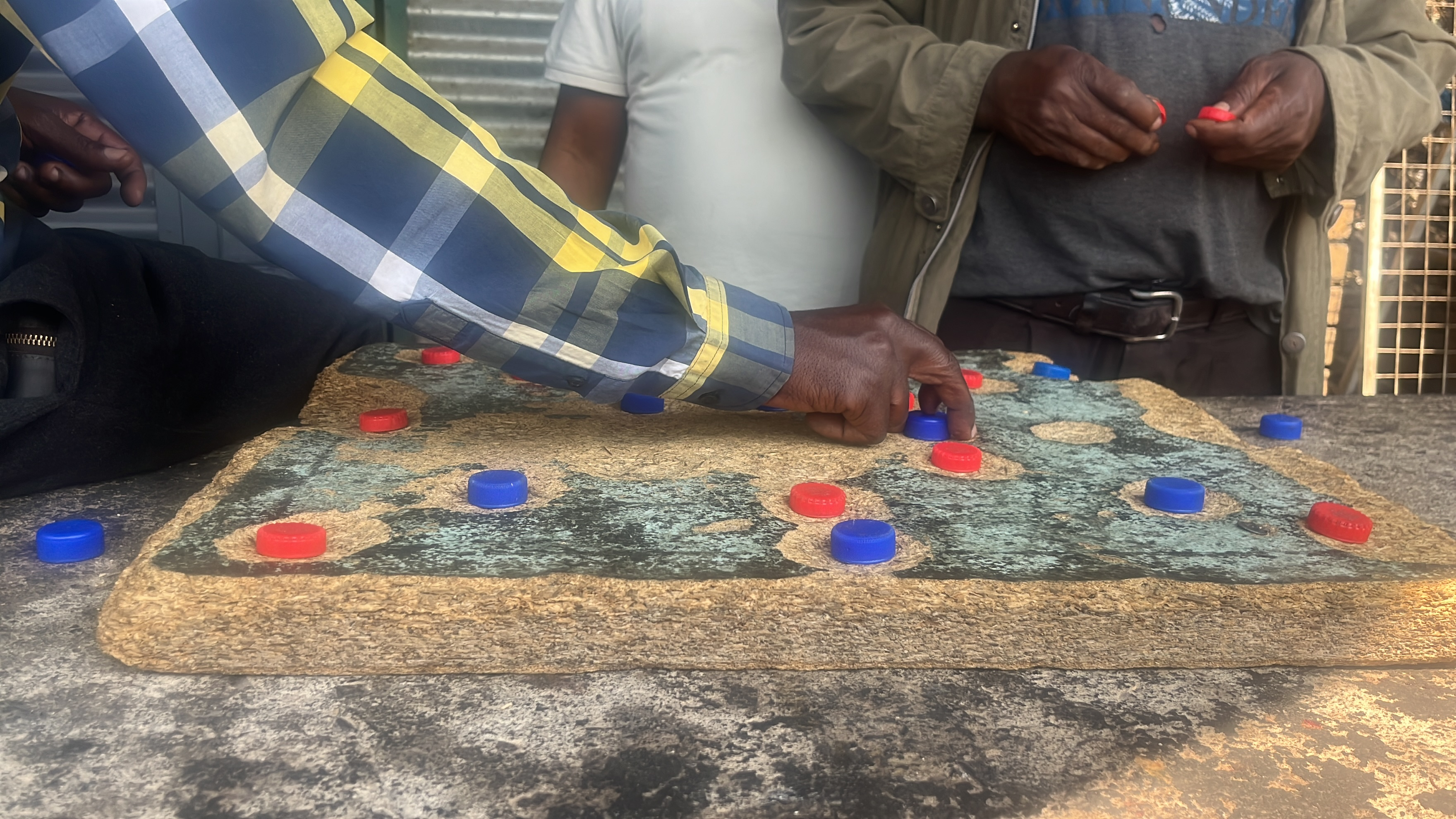

There are three main phases to the game:

1. Placing the cows
2. Moving the cows
3. Flying the cows

=== Placing the cows ===
- The board is empty when the game begins. Each player has 12 pieces, known as "cows"; one player has light cows and the other has dark cows
- The player with the dark cows moves first
- Each turn consists of placing a cow on an empty intersection on the board
- The aim is to create a "mill": a row of three cows on any line drawn on the board
- If a player forms a mill, he or she may remove or "shoot" one of the opponent's cows. The shot cow is removed from the board and not placed again. A cow in a mill may not be shot unless all of the opponent's cows are in mills, in which case any cow may be shot.
- Even if a move creates more than one mill, only one cow can be shot in a single move

=== Moving the cows ===
- After all the cows have been placed, each turn consists of moving a cow to an empty adjacent intersection
- As before, completing a mill allows a player to shoot one of the opponent's cows. Again, this must be a cow which is not in a mill, unless all of the opponent's cows are in mills.
- Players are allowed to "break" their own mills
- A mill may be broken and remade repeatedly by shuffling cows back and forth. Each time the mill is remade, one of the opponent's cows is shot. Of course, by breaking the mill the player exposes the cows which were in a mill to the risk of being shot by the opponent on his or her next turn.
- In the "generally accepted rules" published by Mind Sports South Africa, a mill which is broken to form a new mill can not be formed again on the next move.
- In some instances (in a competitive game) a chess rule "touch is a move" apply for time management. But this rule will be applied depending on the opinion of players.

=== Flying the cows ===
- When a player has only three cows remaining, desperate measures are called for. This player's cows are allowed to "fly" to any empty intersection, not just adjacent ones.
- If one player has three cows and the other player has more than three cows, only the player with three cows is allowed to fly

=== Finishing the game ===
- A win occurs if one opponent has just two cows or if there are no moves.
- If either player has only three cows and neither player shoots a cow within ten moves, the game is drawn
- If one person cheats, then the other one wins by default
- If one player picks up all cows while the play is still on, the player whose cows are on the board wins by default.
- If a player plays twice before the other player, the player who did not play wins by default.

== Morabaraba as sport ==
Currently the International Wargames Federation is the international governing body for the game as a competitive sport, and Mind Sports South Africa (MSSA) is the South African governing body. MSSA is recognised by both the South African Department of Sports and Recreation and the South African Sports Confederation and Olympic Committee (SASCOC) .

MSSA has developed amateur leagues, using different regional versions of the game, throughout the country, and has adopted a notation scoring system similar to that for nine men's morris.

== World Championships ==
Since 1997, Morabaraba World Championships have been held, in three divisions: senior (i.e. adult males), women, and junior (boys and girls). Divisional winners are shown in the table below.

Year	Senior winner	Women winner	Junior winner	Location
1997	Gilbert Magabotse (Mind Sports South Africa)			Old Edwardian Society, Johannesburg, South Africa
1999	Amos Mavuso (Mind Sports South Africa)			The Castle, Cape Town, South Africa
2000	David Hlophe (Mind Sports South Africa)			Epsom College, Epsom, United Kingdom
2001	David Hlophe (Mind Sports South Africa)			Epsom College, Epsom, United Kingdom
2002	Simon Skhosana (Mind Sports South Africa)		Innocent Kubheka (Mind Sports South Africa)	Blue Waters Hotel, Durban, South Africa
2003			Simphiwe Maphumulo (Mind Sports South Africa)	New Orleans, United States of America
2004	Simphiwe Maphumulo (Mind Sports South Africa)			Rome, Italy
2005	Medupe Sekao (Botswana Wargames Federation)	Teresa Chen (Mind Sports South Africa)	Teresa Chen (Mind Sports South Africa)	University of Melbourne, Melbourne, Australia
2006	Thanos Taktikos (Hellenic Wargames Federation)			Gazza, Athens, Greece
2007	Moses Rannyadi (Mind Sports South Africa)	Ledile Tshwane (Mind Sports South Africa)	Innocent Kubheka (Mind Sports South Africa)	Marine Hotel, Port Elizabeth, South Africa
2008	Hanna Melkko (Finnish Historical Wargames Association)	Hanna Melkko (Finnish Historical Wargames Association)		Helsinki, Finland
2012	Simphiwe Maphumulo (Mind Sports South Africa)	Zama Latha (Mind Sports South Africa)		Blue Waters Hotel, Durban, South Africa
2013	Simphiwe Maphumulo (Mind Sports South Africa)			Pretoria Boys High, Pretoria, South Africa
2014	Lejone Malikoe (Lesotho Mind Sports Association)			Victoria Hotel, Maseru, Lesotho
2015	Senane Gadlela (Swaziland Mind Sports Association)	Nipho Sipnepho (Swaziland Mind Sports Association)		Lugogo Sun, Mbabane, Swaziland

== Variations ==
The board used for the Sesotho variation of morabaraba

=== Sesotho board ===
This is the variation typically played by Sesotho-speakers in South Africa and Lesotho. It differs from the standard form in that the board does not have diagonals between the center points of its sides and there is an additional intersection in the center of the board to prevent a draw.

=== Eleven men's morris ===
This is a European variation that uses the same board as morabaraba but is played with eleven counters. This prevents a situation where the game can end in a draw in the placement phase.

=== Gonjilgonu (Chamgonu) ===
This is a Korean variation that uses the same board as morabaraba and is played with twelve counters. But when the counter is removed in the placement phase, that place is "marked" and both players cannot place their counter in that place (i.e., all 24 counters must be placed in a different place). This rule does not apply after the moving phase, and you can move pieces to places that are marked.

== Standard notation ==
The notation used for nine men's morris can also be used for morabaraba. It is very similar to algebraic notation in chess. The board is laid out on a grid, with the columns in the grid being labelled a–g (from left to right), and rows in the grid being labelled from 1–7 (bottom to top). Each point is then referred to by its coordinate; for example, the top-left point in the middle (not inner) square is labelled b6. Moves are then formatted as in chess or draughts: placing a piece is denoted simply by the square where it is placed; moving a piece by the from and to squares (e.g. c5-d5); capturing by appending the captured piece to the move (e.g., c5-b6xe5 or c4xa1).

== See also ==
- International Wargames Federation
- Mind Sports South Africa
