= Shax =

Shax may refer to:

- Shax (board game), an African board game
- Shax (demon), a demon in the Ars Goetia
- Shax, a Dungeons & Dragons vestige
- Shax, a demon in the TV series Charmed, introduced in the 2001 episode "All Hell Breaks Loose"

== See also ==
- Shaxs, a character in the TV series Star Trek: Lower Decks
