= Nine men's morris =

Strategy board game

- A game of nine men's morris in phase two. Even if it is Black's turn, White can remove a black piece each time a mill is formed by moving e3-d3 and then back again d3-e3.
- Years active: > 2000 years ago to present
- Genres: Board game; Abstract strategy game; Mind sport
- Players: 2
- Setup time: < 1 minute
- Playing time: 5–60 minutes
- Chance: None
- Age range: 5+
- Skills: Strategy
- Synonyms: Nine-man morris; Mill, mills, or the mill game; Merels or merrills; Merelles, marelles, or morelles; Ninepenny marl; Cowboy checkers

Nine men's morris is a strategy board game for two players. It is an ancient game, dating back to at least the Roman Empire. The game is also known as nine-man morris, mill, mills, the mill game, merels, merrills, merelles, marelles, morelles, and ninepenny marl in English. In North America, the game has also been called cowboy checkers, and its board is sometimes printed on the back of checkerboards. Nine men's morris is a solved game, that is, a game whose optimal strategy has already been calculated. It has been shown that with perfect play from both players, the game results in a draw.

The classical Latin term mareculus is a diminutive of 'man'; the Ecclesiastical Latin word merellus means 'gamepiece', which may have been corrupted in English to 'morris', whilst miles is Latin for soldier.

Three main alternative variations of the game are three, six, and twelve men's morris.

== Rules ==
The board consists of a grid with twenty-four intersections, or points. Each player has nine pieces, or men, usually coloured black and white. Players try to form 'mills'—three of their own men lined horizontally or vertically—allowing a player to remove an opponent's man from the game. A player wins by reducing the opponent to two men (whereupon they can no longer form mills and thus are unable to win) or by leaving them without a legal move.

The game proceeds in three phases:

1. Placing men on vacant points
2. Moving men to adjacent points
3. (optional phase) Moving men to any vacant point when the player has been reduced to three men

=== Phase 1: placing pieces ===
Nine men's morris starts on an empty board.

The game begins with an empty board. The players determine who plays first and then take turns. During the first phase, a player's turn consists of placing a man from the player's hand onto an empty point. If a player is able to place three pieces on contiguous points in a straight line, vertically or horizontally, they have formed a mill, which allows them to remove one of the opponent's pieces from the board. A piece in an opponent's mill, however, can be removed only if no other pieces are available. After all men have been placed, phase two begins.

=== Phase 2: moving pieces ===
Players continue to alternate moves, this time moving a man to an adjacent point each turn. A piece may not "jump" another piece. Players continue to try to form mills and remove the opponent's pieces as in phase one. If all of a player's pieces get blocked in (where they are unable to move to an adjacent, empty space) that player loses. A player can "break" a mill by moving a piece out of an existing mill, then moving it back to form the same mill a second time (or any number of times), each time removing one of the opponent's men. The act of removing an opponent's man is sometimes called "pounding" the opponent. When one player has been reduced to three men, phase three begins.

=== Phase 3: "flying" ===
When a player is reduced to three pieces, there is no longer a limitation on that player of moving to only adjacent points: The player's men may "fly" (or "hop", or "jump") from any point to any vacant point.

Some rules sources say this is the way the game is played, some treat it as a variation, and some do not mention it at all. A 19th-century games manual calls this the "truly rustic mode of playing the game". Flying was introduced to compensate when the weaker side is one man away from losing the game.

== Strategy ==
At the beginning of the game, it is more important to place pieces in versatile locations rather than to try to form mills immediately and make the mistake of concentrating one's pieces in one area of the board. Contemporary strategy manuals, such as Hans Schürmann and Manfred Nüscheler's So gewinnt man Mühle, Dr. Rainer Rosenberger's muehle lehrbuch and Benjamin Brandwood's Nine Men's Morris: Strategy, Edition 2, further emphasise the importance of building multiple latent mill threats while controlling key junctions that support both offensive mill formation and effective blocking play.

Advanced computer-assisted analysis, including work by the Brillant Mill project by Alexander Szabari, Jozef Mičko, Ferenc Volman and György Bándy and the Malom program developed by G. E. Gévay and G. Danner, demonstrates that many positions are theoretically drawn with perfect play; nonetheless, practical winning chances arise when a player can manoeuvre into structures where a single piece shuttles between two distinct mills, enabling repeated captures or inducing zugzwang-like situations for the opponent. In high-level play, an ideal winning configuration is therefore one in which a player maintains such a "double-mill" shuttle while following precise, engine-verified sequences to convert structural advantages into victory or, at minimum, to avoid well-known drawing sequences identified in these computational studies.

== Variants ==
=== Three men's morris ===

Three men's morris, also called nine-holes, is played on the points of a grid of 2×2 squares, or in the squares of a grid of 3×3 squares, as in tic-tac-toe. The game is for two players; each player has three men. The players put one man on the board in each of their first three plays, winning if a mill is formed (as in tic-tac-toe). After that, each player moves one of the player's men, according to one of the following rules versions:

1. To any empty position
2. To any adjacent empty position

A player wins by forming a mill.

H. J. R. Murray calls version No. 1 "nine holes", and version No. 2 "three men's morris" or "the smaller merels".

=== Six men's morris ===

Six men's morris gives each player six pieces and is played without the outer square of the board for nine men's morris. Flying is not permitted. The game was popular in Italy, France and England during the Middle Ages but was obsolete by 1600.

This board is also used for five men's morris (also called smaller merels). Seven men's morris uses this board with a cross in the center.

=== Twelve men's morris ===

Twelve men's morris adds four diagonal lines to the board and gives each player twelve pieces. This means the board can be filled in the placement stage; if this happens the game is a draw. This variation on the game is popular amongst rural youth in South Africa where it is known as morabaraba and is now recognized as a sport in that country. H. J. R. Murray also calls the game "the larger merels".

This board is also used for eleven men's morris.

=== Lasker morris ===
This variant (also called ten men's morris) was invented by Emanuel Lasker, chess world champion from 1894 to 1921. It is based on the rules of nine men's morris, but there are two differences: each player gets ten pieces; and pieces can be moved in the first phase already. This means each player can choose to either place a new piece or to move one of the player's pieces already on the board. This variant is more complex than nine men's morris, and draws are less likely.

== History ==
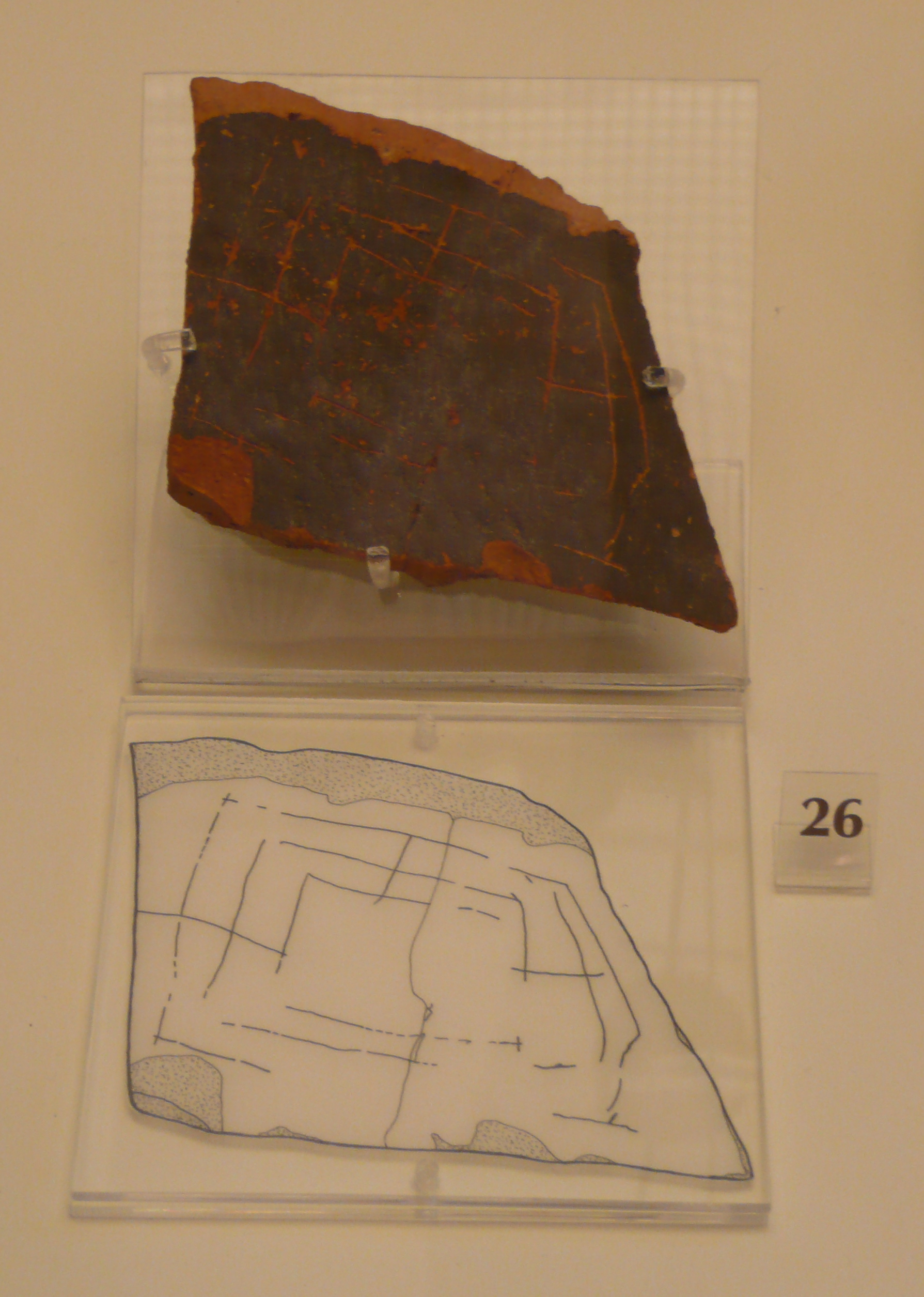
Clay tile fragment from the archeological museum at Mycenae showing what appears to be a Nine Men's Morris board

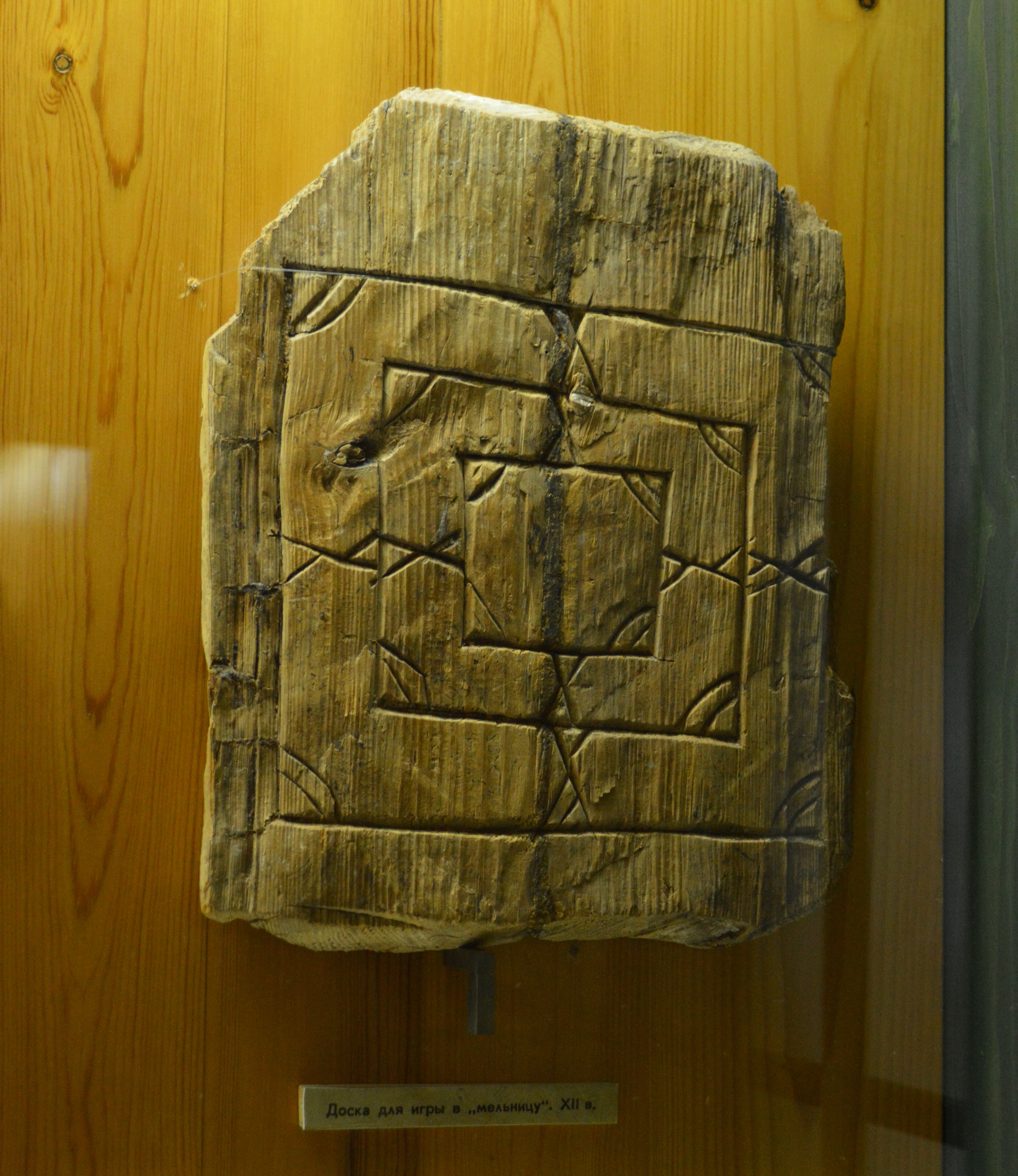
Medieval Nine Men's Morris board, Novgorod, 12th century

Based on boards for the game, which included diagonal lines, "cut into the roofing slabs of the temple at Kurna in Egypt", R. C. Bell assumes a date for them of c. 1400 BCE. However, Friedrich Berger argued that some of the diagrams at Kurna include Coptic crosses, making it "doubtful" that the diagrams date to 1400 BCE. Berger concluded: "Certainly they cannot be dated." However, these Coptic crosses themselves are dated no earlier than 42 CE according to Coptic Orthodox tradition, very near the end of the known architectural development of the temple.

One of the earliest mentions of the game may be in Ovid's Ars Amatoria. In book III (c. 8 CE), after discussing latrones, a popular board game, Ovid wrote:

There is another game divided into as many parts as there are months in the year. A table has three pieces on either side; the winner must get all the pieces in a straight line. It is a bad thing for a woman not to know how to play, for love often comes into being during play.

Berger believes the game was "probably well known by the Romans", as there are many boards on Roman buildings, even though dating them is impossible because the buildings "have been easily accessible" since they were built. It is possible that the Romans were introduced to the game via trade routes, but this cannot be proven.

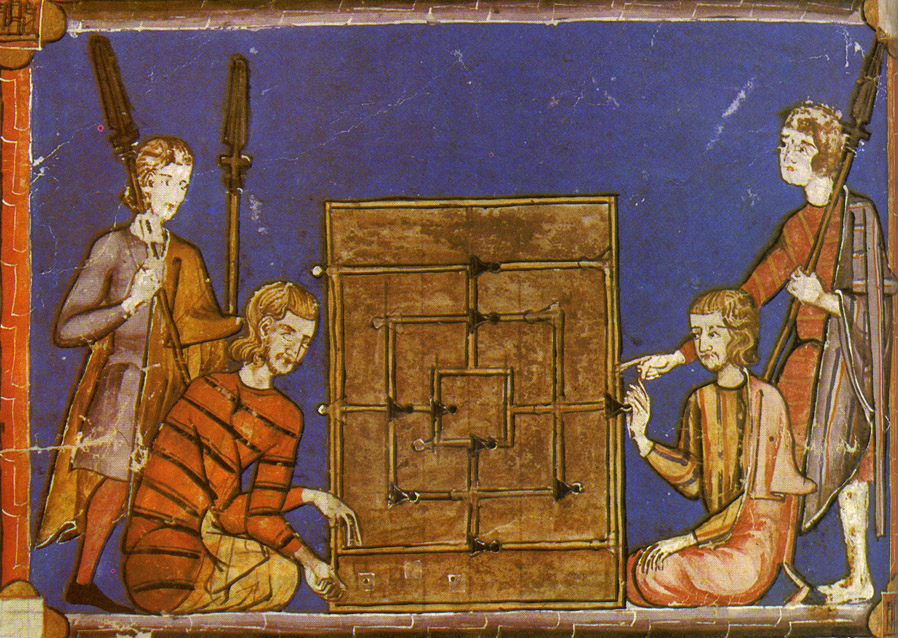
A 13th-century illustration in Libro de los juegos of the game being played with dice

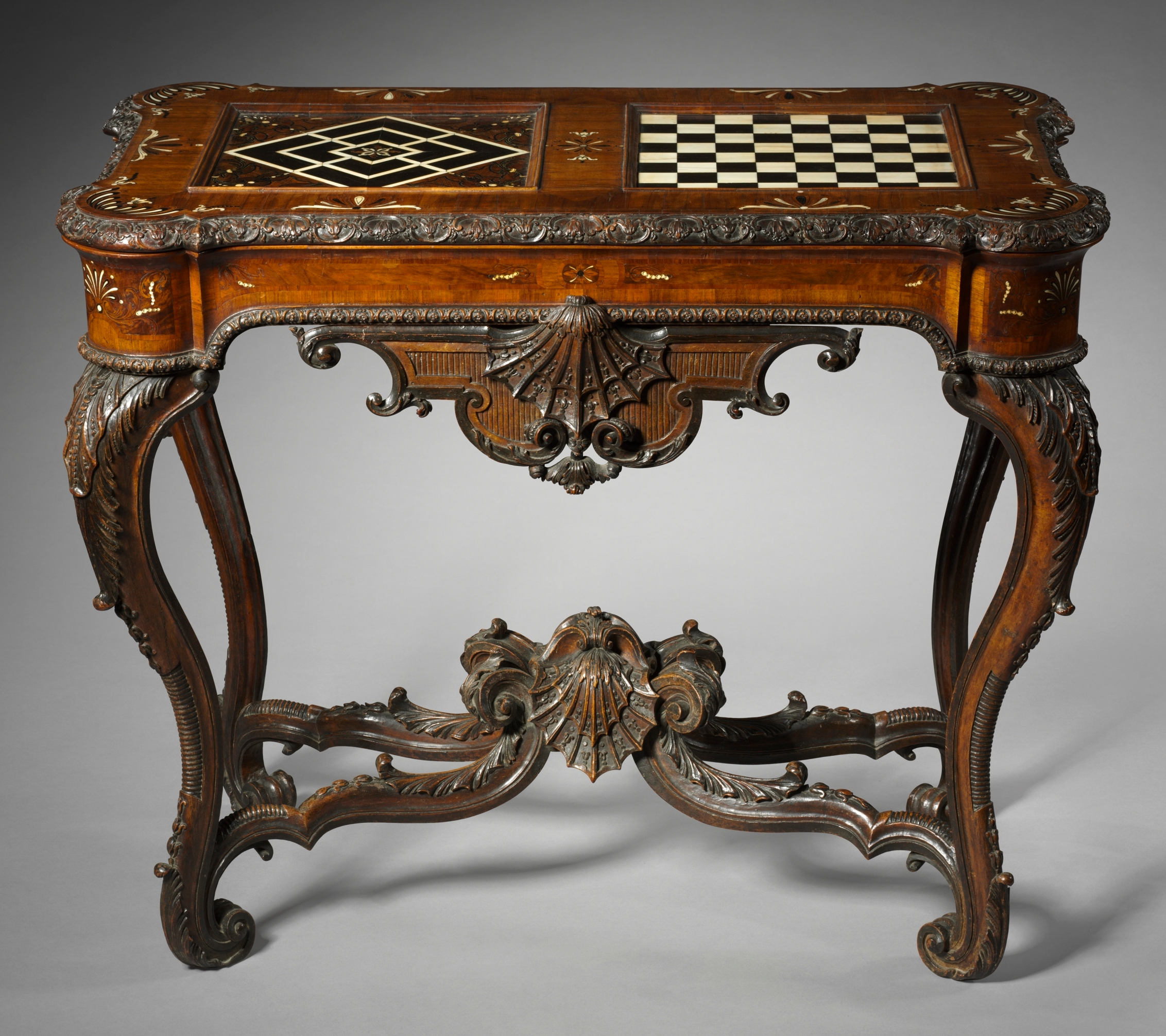
An early gaming table (Germany, 1735) featuring chess/draughts (right) and nine men's morris (left), Cleveland Museum of Art

The game might have been played by the sculptors while they were building the huge temples. Inscriptions are seen in many places, carved on stone. The game peaked in popularity in medieval England. A brick found on a mediaeval site near Wisbech, had been used by the brickmakers as a board before being fired. Boards have been found carved into the cloister seats at the English cathedrals at Canterbury, Gloucester, Norwich, Salisbury and Westminster Abbey. These boards used holes, not lines, to represent the nine spaces on the board—hence the name "nine holes"—and forming a diagonal row did not win the game. Another board is carved into the base of a pillar in Chester Cathedral in Chester. Giant outdoor boards were sometimes cut into village greens. In Shakespeare's 16th century work A Midsummer Night's Dream, Titania refers to such a board: "The nine men's morris is filled up with mud".

Some authors say the game's origin is uncertain. It has been speculated that its name may be related to Morris dances, and hence to Moorish, but according to Daniel King, "the word 'morris' has nothing to do with the old English dance of the same name. It comes from the Latin word merellus, which means a counter or gaming piece." King also notes that the game was popular among Roman soldiers.

In some European countries, the design of the board was given special significance as a symbol of protection from evil.

== Related games ==
- Achi, from Ghana, is played on a three men's morris board with diagonals. Each player has four pieces, which can only move to adjacent spaces.
- Kensington is a similar game in which two players take turns placing pieces and try to arrange them in certain ways.
- Luk ssut k'i ('six man chess') in Canton, China, also played as Tapatan in the Philippines, is equivalent to three men's morris played on a board with diagonals.
- Morabaraba, almost equivalent to twelve men's morris. However, rather than men, the counters are called "cows". It is played competitively internationally in competitions run by the International Wargames Federation.
- Lusalos is played in the Philippines. It uses the same board and number of pieces as Nine Men's Morris. The rules are identical, except that Phase 3 (the Flying rule) is not included.
- Shax is played on the board of nine men's morris, but with somewhat different rules and with twelve pieces per player instead of nine.
- Fangqi is played on a seven-by-seven grid. Players move pieces one point at a time along the grid, attempting to form four-by-four squares and removing one of the opponent's pieces after forming a square. It is played in Xinjiang and other parts of northwest China.
- Tic-tac-toe uses a three-by-three board, on which players place pieces (or make marks) in turn until one player wins by forming an orthogonal or diagonal line, or until the board is full and the game is drawn (tied).

== See also ==
- History of games
- Méreau (token)
