= International Wargames Federation =

South African Organization

- Abbreviation: IWF
- Formation: October 3, 1991; 35 years ago
- Type: Sports federation
- Legal status: Association not for gain
- Purpose: Promotion of tactical and strategic games
- Headquarters: Germiston, South Africa
- Official language: English
- Main organ: General Meeting

The International Wargames Federation (IWF) is the international body uniting national wargaming federations of South Africa and was founded in 1991.

The IWF members are part of a greater movement toward integration of Mind Sports in the regular sports arena.

== History ==
The International Wargames Federation was founded by the Derby Wargames Club and Mind Sports South Africa in 1991. It is the international controlling body for historical miniatures games other types of wargames and promotes all wargames on a worldwide level.

As a result of the International Wargames Federation being formed, members like Mind Sports South Africa have been allowed to affiliate with the South African Sports Confederation and Olympic Committee, and award officially accredited national colours to players who represent South Africa in official test matches and world championships.

== World Championships ==
Today world 'championships' are played annually.

The World Championships have been played at the following locations:

- 1997 - Old Edwardian Society, Johannesburg, South Africa
- 1999 - The Castle, Cape Town, South Africa
- 2000 - Epsom College, Epsom, United Kingdom
- 2001 - Epsom College, Epsom, United Kingdom
- 2002 - Blue Waters Hotel, Durban, South Africa
- 2003 - New Orleans, United States of America
- 2004 - Rome, Italy
- 2005 - University of Melbourne, Melbourne, Australia
- 2006 - Gazzi, Athens, Greece
- 2007 - Marine Hotel, Port Elizabeth, South Africa
- 2008 - Helsinki, Finland
- 2009 - Crown Plaza, Alexandria, USA
- 2010 - Athens, Greece
- 2011 - Wellington, new Zealand
- 2012 - Blue Waters Hotel, Durban, South Africa
- 2013 - Pretoria Boys High School, Pretoria, South Africa
- 2014 - Hotel Victoria, Maseru, Lesotho
- 2015 - Lugogo Sun, Mbabane, Swaziland

== Games/periods played ==
The most popular competition periods for World Championships are:

- Ancients (3000Bc to 1500AD)
- Pike & Shot (1500AD to 1700AD)
- World War II
- Morabaraba
- SesothoMorabaraba

== World Champions ==
World Champions are:

Ancients (DBM) - Male
Date	Name of player	flag	Member
1997	Iain McNeil	United Kingdom	(British Historical Games Society)
1999	Terry Shaw	United Kingdom	(British Historical Games Society)
2000	Simon Hall	United Kingdom	(British Historical Games Society)
2001	Iain McNeil	United Kingdom	(British Historical Games Society)
2002	Simon Hall	United Kingdom	(British Historical Games Society)
2003	Terry Shaw	United Kingdom	(British Historical Games Society)
2004	Simon Hall	United Kingdom	(British Historical Games Society)
2005	David Handley	United Kingdom	(British Historical Games Society)
2006	Graham Evans	United Kingdom	(British Historical Games Society)
2007	James Hamilton	United Kingdom	(British Historical Games Society)
2008	Jason Broomer	United Kingdom	(British Historical Games Society)
2009	Hannu Uusitalo	Finland	Finnish Historical Wargames Association
2010	Niilo Kalakoski	Finland	Finnish Historical Wargames Association
2011	Mike Walsh	Australia	The Society of Australian Ancients Wargamers
2012	Eugene Burger	South Africa	Mind Sports South Africa
2013	Colin Webster	South Africa	Mind Sports South Africa
2014	Colin Webster	South Africa	Mind Sports South Africa
2015	Colin Webster	South Africa	Mind Sports South Africa

Ancients (DBM) - Female
Date	Name of player	Flag	Member
2003	Lynda Fairhurst	United Kingdom	British Historical Games Society
2004	Lynda Fairhurst	United Kingdom	British Historical Games Society
2005	Lynda Fairhurst	United Kingdom	British Historical Games Society
2006	Bernice Ligault	South Africa	Mind Sports South Africa
2007	Bernice Ligault	South Africa	Mind Sports South Africa
2014	Elishia Retief	South Africa	Mind Sports South Africa
2015	Elishia Retief	South Africa	Mind Sports South Africa

Ancients (DBM) - Junior male
Date	Name of player	Flag	Member
2000	Andre Tonkin	South Africa	South African Wargames Union
2001	Matthew Strachan	South Africa	South African Wargames Union
2002	Benjamin Shulman	South Africa	South African Wargames Union
2003	Angelo Stathoussis	South Africa	South African Wargames Union
2004	Angelo Stathoussis	South Africa	South African Wargames Union
2005	Angelo Stathoussis	South Africa	South African Wargames Union
2006	Pierre Ippolito	France	Federation Francaise de Jeu d’Histoire
2007	Pierre Ippolito	France	Federation Francaise de Jeu d’Histoire
2008	Joona Tervonen	Finland	Finnish Historical Wargames Association
2009	Duane Havenga	South Africa	Mind Sports South Africa
2010	Gregory Laycock	South Africa	Mind Sports South Africa
2012	Gregory Laycock	South Africa	Mind Sports South Africa
2013	Adam Louw	South Africa	Mind Sports South Africa
2014	Jason Batzofin	South Africa	Mind Sports South Africa
2015	Jason Batzofin	South Africa	Mind Sports South Africa

Ancients (Field of Glory) - Male
Date	Name of player	Flag	Member
2009	Pete Dalby	United Kingdom	British Historical Games Society
2010	Graham Evans	United Kingdom	British Historical Games Society
2011	Shaun Drummond	New Zealand	New Zealand Wargames Association

Pike & Shot - Male
Date	Name of player	Flag	Member
2000	Frederic DuFour	France	Federation Francaise de Jeu d’Histoire
2001	Pete Dalby	United Kingdom	British Historical Games Society
2002	Edward van Trotsenburg	South Africa	South African Wargames Union
2003	Kevin Brewin	United Kingdom	British Historical Games Society
2004	Pete Dalby	United Kingdom	British Historical Games Society
2005	David Clarke	United Kingdom	British Historical Games Society
2006	David Clarke	United Kingdom	British Historical Games Society
2007	Charles Masefield	United Kingdom	British Historical Games Society
2008	Charles Masefield	United Kingdom	British Historical Games Society
2009	Edward van Trotsenburg	South Africa	Mind Sports South Africa
2011	Mark Robins	Australia	The Society of Australian Ancients Wargamers

Pike & Shot - Junior male
Date	Name of player	Flag	Member
2007	Duane Havenga	South Africa	Mind Sports South Africa

Morabaraba - Senior
Date	Name of player	Flag	Member
1997	Gilbert Magabotse	South Africa	South African Wargames Union
1999	Amos Mavuso	South Africa	South African Wargames Union
2000	David Hlophe	South Africa	South African Wargames Union
2001	David Hlophe	South Africa	South African Wargames Union
2002	Simon Skhosana	South Africa	South African Wargames Union
2004	Simphiwe Maphumulo	South Africa	South African Wargames Union
2005	Medupe Sekao	Botswana	Botswana Wargames Federation
2006	Thanos Taktikos	Greece	Hellenic Wargames Federation
2007	Moses Rannyadi	South Africa	Mind Sports South Africa
2008	Hanna Melkko	Finland	Finnish Historical Wargames Association
2012	Simphiwe Maphumulo	South Africa	Mind Sports South Africa
2013	Simphiwe Maphumulo	South Africa	Mind Sports South Africa
2014	Lejone Malikoe	Lesotho	Lesotho Mind Sports Association
2015	Senane Gadlela	Swaziland	Swaziland Mind Sports Association

Morabaraba - Women
Date	Name of player	Flag	Member
2005	Teresa Chen	South Africa	South African Wargames Union
2007	Ledile Tshwane	South Africa	Mind Sports South Africa
2008	Hanna Melkko	Finland	Finnish Historical Wargames Association
2012	Zama Lathla	South Africa	Mind Sports South Africa
2015	Nipho Sipnepho	Swaziland	Swaziland Mind Sports Association

Morabaraba - Junior
Date	Name of player	Flag	Member
2002	Innocent Kubheka	South Africa	South African Wargames Union
2003	Simphiwe Maphumulo	South Africa	South African Wargames Union
2005	Teresa Chen	South Africa	South African Wargames Union
2007	Innocent Kubheka	South Africa	Mind Sports South Africa

Sesothomorabaraba - Male
Date	Name of player	Flag	Member
2014	Tatiso Khosi	Lesotho	Lesotho Mind Sports Association

== Presidents, past and present ==
Any organisation depends on the vision of the President. The term of office in the IWF, for such position is currently four years.

Period	Name	Country of origin
1991 to 2001	David Hutchby	Britain
2001 to 2004	Lorenzo Mele	Italy
2004 to 2006	Scott Nicholas	Australia
2006 to 2011	James Hamilton	Britain
2011 to 2013	Hannu Uusitalo	Finland
2013 to present	Colin Webster	South Africa

== See also ==
- Mind Sports South Africa
