= Turup =

Card game played in Northeast Africa

Turup, also known as arpaa turup, is a card game played widely in Northeast Africa. In Somalia, it involves four players, usually using a 144-card pack made up 4 identical 36-card packs.

== Game play ==
The game uses a standard French deck of playing cards. One deck is used for 2-4 players (52 cards), 2 decks are used for 5-7 players (104 cards) and 3 decks are used for 8-12 players (156 cards). Each player is dealt four cards and a four-card community pile is also dealt. The general purpose of turup is to collect the highest number of cards from the community pile that add or equal a card from a players individual hands. After a deal the first person to the left of the dealer begins the play. The dealer also rotates to the left after each round. There are two ways to collect the cards from the community pile; a match or addition. Face cards cannot be won with addition and can only be won as a match. Only one card from the players hand can be played at a time and after a play is made play moves to the next player. Aces are valued as a one.

=== Match ===
In turn, each player compares their hand to the community pile. If a card in their hand matches one of the cards in the community pile the player can collect the card and place both the card from their hand and the card from the community in a separate pile of cards won, the suit of the card does not come into play.

Match example: A players owns a six and there is a six in the community pile, the player can collect the six and match it to the six from their hand. Only one card from the players hand can be played at a time and after a play is made play moves to the next player.

=== Addition ===
In turn, each player compares their hand to the community pile. If a card in the players hand equals the addition of two or more cards then the player can collect all the cards from the community pile that add to the players card and place all the cards in their separate pile of cards won, again the suit of the cards do not come into play.

Addition example: A player owns a ten and there is a four and a six in the community pile. The player can collect the four and the six from the community and add it to equal the ten from their hand.

=== Addition and Match ===
In turn, each player compares their hand to the community pile. If a card in the players hand equals the addition of two or more cards AND matches a card all cards equaling the players card can be won by the player.

Add and Match example: A player owns a queen, a ten and a five and the community pile contains a three, two, king and five. The player can combine the two and three to equal the players five and match the five in the community pile with the players five for a total of four cards won.

=== No Match or Addition ===
If the player cannot make an equal from the community pile then the player must place a card from their hand into the community pile and play moves to the next player. If there are no cards in the community pile the next player in turn must place a card down in the community pile. A player does not have to make a match or addition even if the player owns a match or addition, this is explained in the Strategy section below.

=== Winning ===
After all four cards have been played from each of the hands of the players another four cards are dealt from the remaining deck of cards. Once the remaining deck of cards have all been dealt each player counts the cards from their individual separate pile of cards won. The player with the highest number of cards wins the round. Any cards left in the community pile are not counted towards any players cards won. The number of rounds can be preset or tallied for posterior acknowledgement.

== Strategies ==
=== Massive Addition ===
There are several strategies that can be used in the game of turup. This will list a few of the basic strategies involved when trying to create an equal with a players hand. The value of ten is the easiest card to equal through addition. The value of ten has the most combinations of cards to total. If the community pile included an ace, two, three and a four the total of the four cards would equal ten. A player with a 10 could collect all 4 cards in the community pile and their own ten for a total of 5 cards won.

=== Delayed Match ===
A player can also use strategy to set up for an addition by placing cards from their deck with a lower value to use on their next turn. This strategy runs the risk of another player using that card for a match or addition.

Delayed Match example: Let's say the community pile included a king, three, six and Jack and the player holds a five and an eight. The player can place their five into the community pile with hopes of using the three and the five to add to their last remaining card which is an eight, but again this runs the risk that the other player(s) will use either the three or five for a match of their own.

=== Doubled Match ===
A third an even more riskier play is after a player makes a match the player can choose to leave the match in the community pile with the hopes of making the same match on the players next turn. This is generally only done when a multiple card is owned by a player, in other words 2 kings in hand.

Doubled Match example: If the community pile consists of a king, three and eight and the players hand contains a king, another king and a two. The player would create a match with the king and leaves the king in the community pile with the hopes on matching the other king on the next turn. This runs the risk of another player having a king in hand and collecting the previous match of kings on their turn, taking away the cards won from the first player.

== See also ==
- Shax (board game)
