= Fangqi =

Fangqi (方棋)
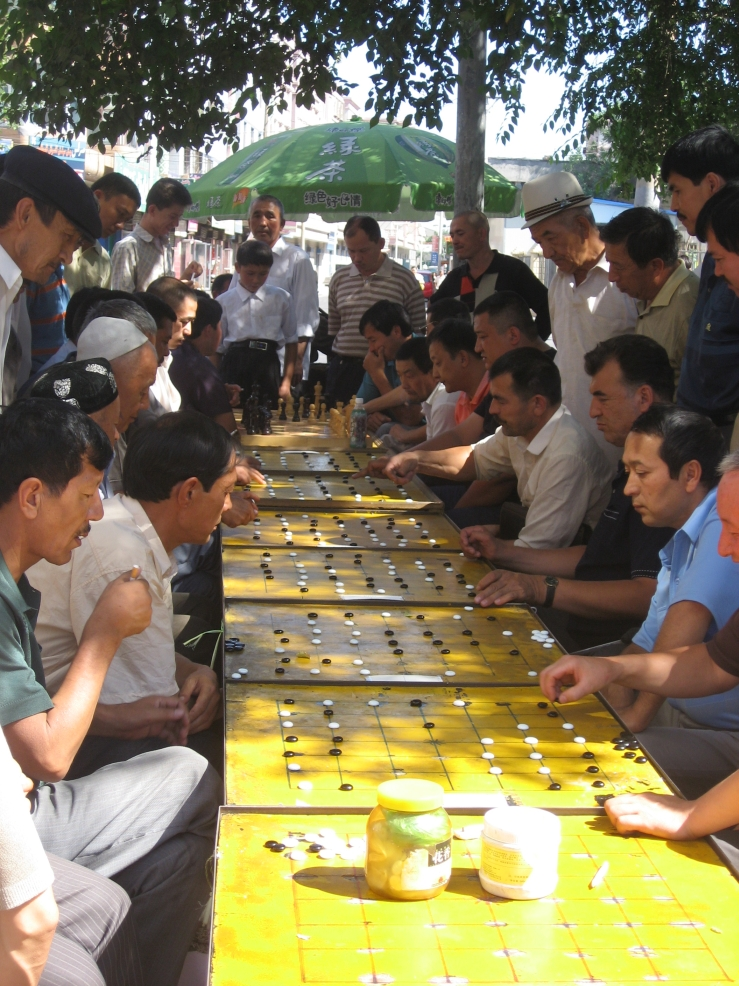
- Men in an Ürümqi neighborhood playing Xinjiang Fāngqí (新疆方棋)
- Genres: Board game Abstract strategy game
- Players: 2
- Setup time: < 1 minute
- Playing time: < 1 hour
- Chance: None
- Age range: Any
- Skills: Strategy, tactics
- Synonyms: Square game / Game of squares Playing squares Square chess Xia fang

Fangqi (Chinese: 方棋; pinyin: fāngqí) is a strategy board game played traditionally throughout Northern China as a training game for weiqi (Go). Fangqi is also known as diūfāng (Chinese: 丢方) and xiàfāng (Chinese: 下方). Muslim people of Chinese origin (Dungans), brought the game with them to Central Asian countries such as Kyrgyzstan and Kazakhstan.

== Equipment ==
Board size varies from region to region. In Ningxia, the game is played on a 7×8 gridded board using black and white Go stones, 28 stones per player. The game is popular in agricultural communities in Northwestern China, and often played on a board traced out on the ground.

== Rules ==
The pieces are played on grid line intersections, the same as in Go. The game is similar in concept to nine men's morris:

1. Players alternate turns placing stones, attempting to form 2×2 squares, until the board is filled.
2. Each player removes one of their opponent's stones.
3. Each player counts up the squares they have formed and removes an equal number of the opponent's stones, as long as those pieces are not part of a square.
4. Players alternate turns moving stones; pieces can move any distance vertically or horizontally along a grid. Each time a player forms a square, the player removes one of the opponent's stones (again, as long as the piece is not part of an existing square).

The player who removes all of the opponent's stones is the winner.

== Variants ==
Xinjiang Fāngqí is played on a 7×7 board. Because this leads to an odd number of playing points (49) the first player has an advantage. Thus, the second player is allowed to remove one more stone from the opponent during the initial removal of pieces.

Other variants of the game allow encirclement of stones, as in Go. Still other variants disallow certain moves, for example, forming a square in the same way repeatedly (similar to the ko rule in Go).

Because of the game's popularity in rural areas, the game has many variants, each specific to its local area.

- Ningxia Fāngqí
- Xinjiang Fāngqí
- Tibet Fāngqí
- Nigel Fāngqí
- Qinghai Fāngqí
- 大邊棋
- 關中掐方棋
- 六州棋
- 六道棋
- 五棍棋
- 大方棋
