= Confederation of African Esports =

Governing body of esports in Africa

- Abbreviation: CAES
- Formation: 14 June 2008; 18 years ago
- Type: Sports Federation
- Legal status: Association
- Purpose: Controlling body for esports in Africa
- Headquarters: Germiston, South Africa
- Members: 5 member National federations
- Official language: English
- President: Mrs. Amanda Pakade
- Volunteers: 6
- Website: https://www.facebook.com/ConfederationofAfricaneSports/

The Confederation of African Esports (CAES) is the governing body of Esports in Africa.

== Members ==
So far, there are 5 member nations in CAES.

Nation	Organization
Egypt	
Namibia	NeSA
Nigeria	NeSF
South Africa	MSSA
Tunisia	TUNeSF

== History ==
The Confederation of African Esports was formally constituted on 14 June 2007.

== Structure ==
Confederation of African Esports, like other sports confederations, is constituted as a voluntary association.

The highest authority of the CAES is the Annual General Meeting, which holds all Committees accountable for their actions.

The management board deals with the day-to-day operations of CAES and overseas the different Boards of Control.

== History of the emblem ==
In 2008, the logo included the mind sports logo. The mind sports logo was dropped in 2013 in favour of the wording 'CAES'.

== Official Test matches ==
The following test matches were held:

Year	Date	Countries	Title played	Result
2020	29 April 2020	Namibia, South Africa	DotA 2	0 - 2
2018	23 June 2018	Namibia, South Africa	Tekken 7 (Male), Tekken 7 (Female), FIFA'18	0 - 2, 0 - 1, 1–1
2018	17 March 2018	Ghana, South Africa	FIFA'18 and Tekken 7	3 - 1, 2–2
2017	16 September 2017	Tunisia, South Africa	League of Legends	2 - 0
2017	30 July 2017	Namibia, South Africa	FIFA '17	1–0
2016	9 October 2016	Egypt, South Africa	HearthStone	1-1
2016	6 February 2016	Ghana, South Africa	FIFA'16	5–1
2015	14 August 2015	Algeria, South Africa	CounterStrike: GO	1–0
2015	14 August 2015	Libya, South Africa	CounterStrike: GO	1–0
2015	13 August 2015	Tunisia, South Africa	CounterStrike: GO	1–0
2015	13 August 2015	Egypt, South Africa	CounterStrike: GO	1–0
2015	27 March 2015	South Africa, Zimbabwe	FIFA '15	2–0
2014	25 October 2014	Namibia, South Africa	Dota 2	0–2
2014	8 August 2014	Egypt, South Africa	DotA 2	2–0
2013	31 July 2013	Romania, South Africa	DotA 2	1–0
2010	8 December 2010	Namibia, South Africa	FIFA '10	0–2
2010	8 December 2010	Namibia, South Africa	Call of Duty 4	0–1

== Continental Championships ==
Year	host	venue	titles played	YouTube coverage
2008	South Africa (MSSA)	University of the Witwatersrand, Johannesburg, South Africa	DotA, Counter-Strike 1.6	African Continentals e-Sports Championship 2008

== Presidents ==
CAES has had the following Presidents from the period of 2008 up to the present:

Year	President	Country
2021	Amanda Kwaza	South Africa
2019 - 2020	Ahmed Cheikhrouhou	Tunisia
2013 - 2018	Mohammed Saad	Egypt
2007 - 2012	Colin Webster	South Africa
