= Mukhamed Izbastin =

Kazakh businessman (born 1982)

- Мұхамед Теміртайұлы Ізбастин
- Born: 11 January 1982 (age 44); Almaty
- Citizenship: Kazakhstan
- Education: Moscow State Institute of International Relations
- Occupations: businessman, President of the Qazaq Cybersport Federation

Mukhamed Temirtaevich Izbastin (born January 11, 1982, Almaty, Kazakh SSR, USSR) is a Kazakh businessman, investor, and President of the Qazaq Cybersport Federation.

== Biography ==
=== Education ===
In 2003, he graduated from the Moscow State Institute of International Relations (MGIMO) with a degree in International Economics. In 2005, he earned his Candidate of Sciences degree at the Diplomatic Academy of the Ministry of Foreign Affairs of the Russian Federation with a dissertation titled “Effectiveness Issues of International Cooperation between Kazakhstan, Russia, and Other Countries in the Development of Hydrocarbon Resources of the Caspian Sea.”

=== Career ===
From 2003 to 2018, he was a co-founder and executive director of the oil production company ABI Petroleum Capital LLP.

Since 2016, he has served as the Honorary Consul of the Republic of Cyprus in the Republic of Kazakhstan.

Нe is major businessman, in 2022, he was included in Forbes' list of the “50 Most Influential Businessmen of Kazakhstan.”

On February 3, 2026, he was elected President of the Qazaq Cybersport Federation for a four-year term.

He is the owner of 3I Materials, a company specializing in the production of energy-efficient environmentally friendly construction materials.

=== Philanthropy ===
He is a co-founder of a charitable foundation established in 2008 in honor of the Kazakh writer Kemel Tokayev. The foundation's mission focuses on supporting children, students, and families in the city of Ushtobe, where the writer lived and worked.

In 2022, he donated 100 million Kazakh tenge (approximately 230,000 US dollars) to the public social fund “Kazakhstan Halkyna” (“To the People of Kazakhstan”), an organization addressing issues in healthcare, education, culture, and sports in Kazakhstan.

During the 2024 floods, which affected over ten regions of Kazakhstan, Izbastin donated 450 million Kazakh tenge (approximately 1 million US dollars) to support those affected.

=== Personal life and interests ===
He is fluent in four languages: Kazakh, Russian, English, and German. His interests include horseback riding and alpine skiing.

He supports initiatives related to youth development, environmental issues, and the promotion of national culture in Kazakhstan. He actively supports esports as a promising high-tech field for young people and contributes to its development in the country.
