= Qazaq Cybersport Federation =

- Қазақстан киберспорт федерациясы
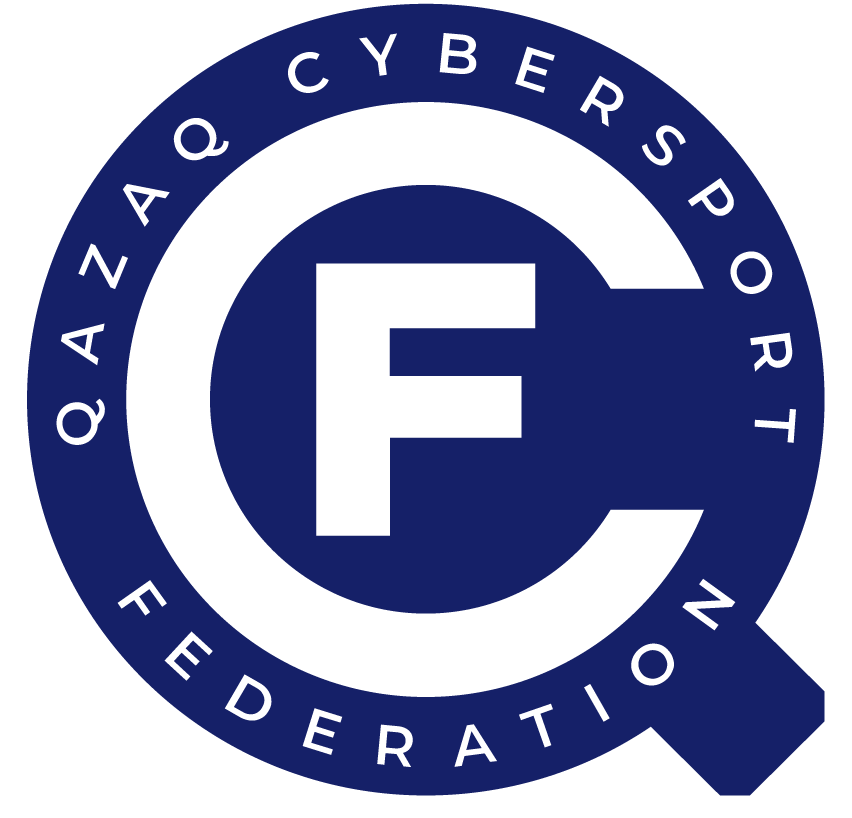
- Sport: Esports
- Founded: 2017
- Regional affiliation: Republic of Kazakhstan
- Headquarters: Astana
- President: Mukhamed Izbastin
- Vice president: Efim Chervakov

Official website
- qcf.kz

Qazaq Cybersport Federation (QCF) is a sports organization in the Republic of Kazakhstan and a national public association. Its stated objectives include the development and promotion of esports in the country and its integration into the international esports community. In 2020, the Federation was recognized by the National Olympic Committee of the Republic of Kazakhstan.

The organization was founded in 2017 and is headquartered in Astana.

== History ==
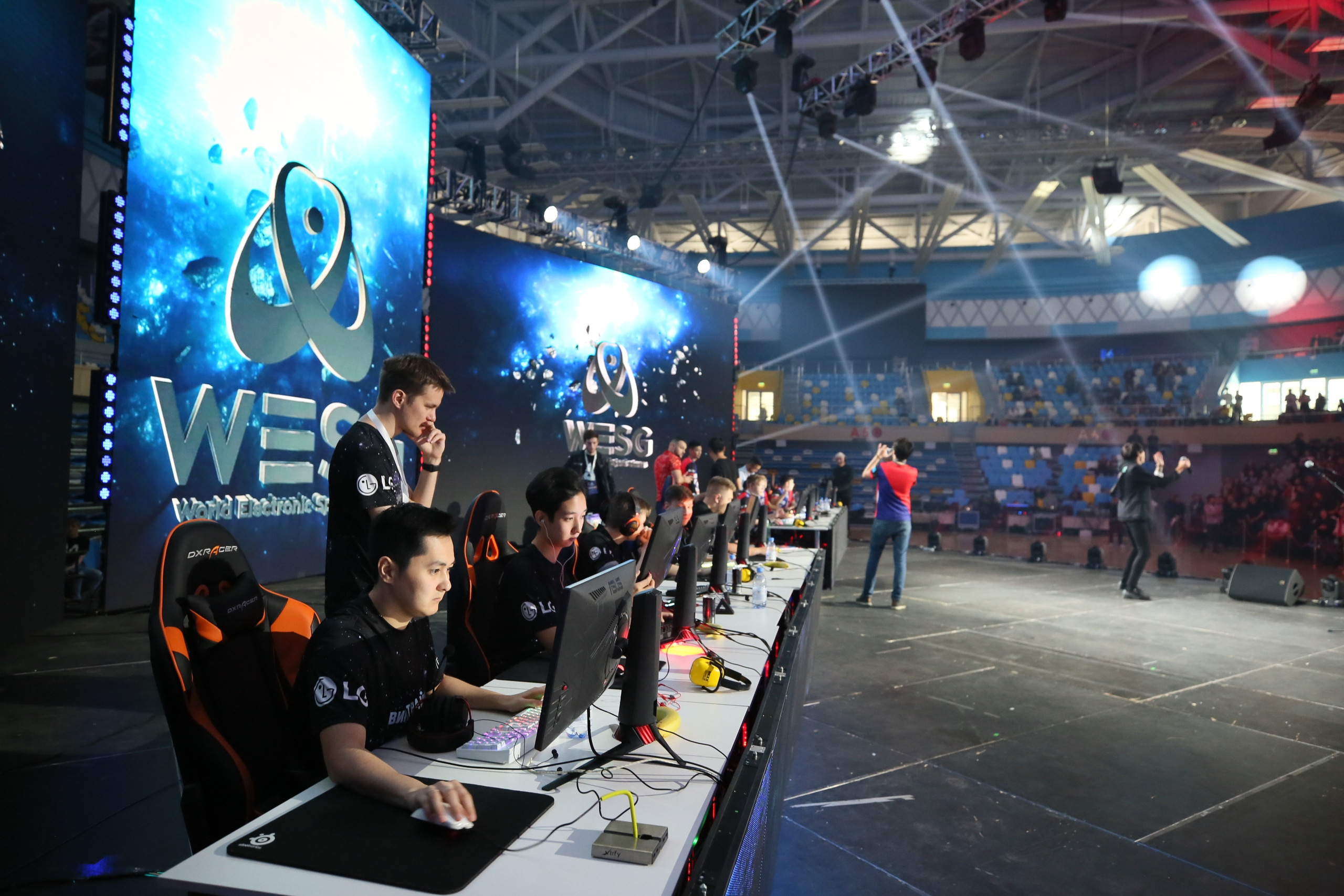
WESG 2019 in Kazakhstan

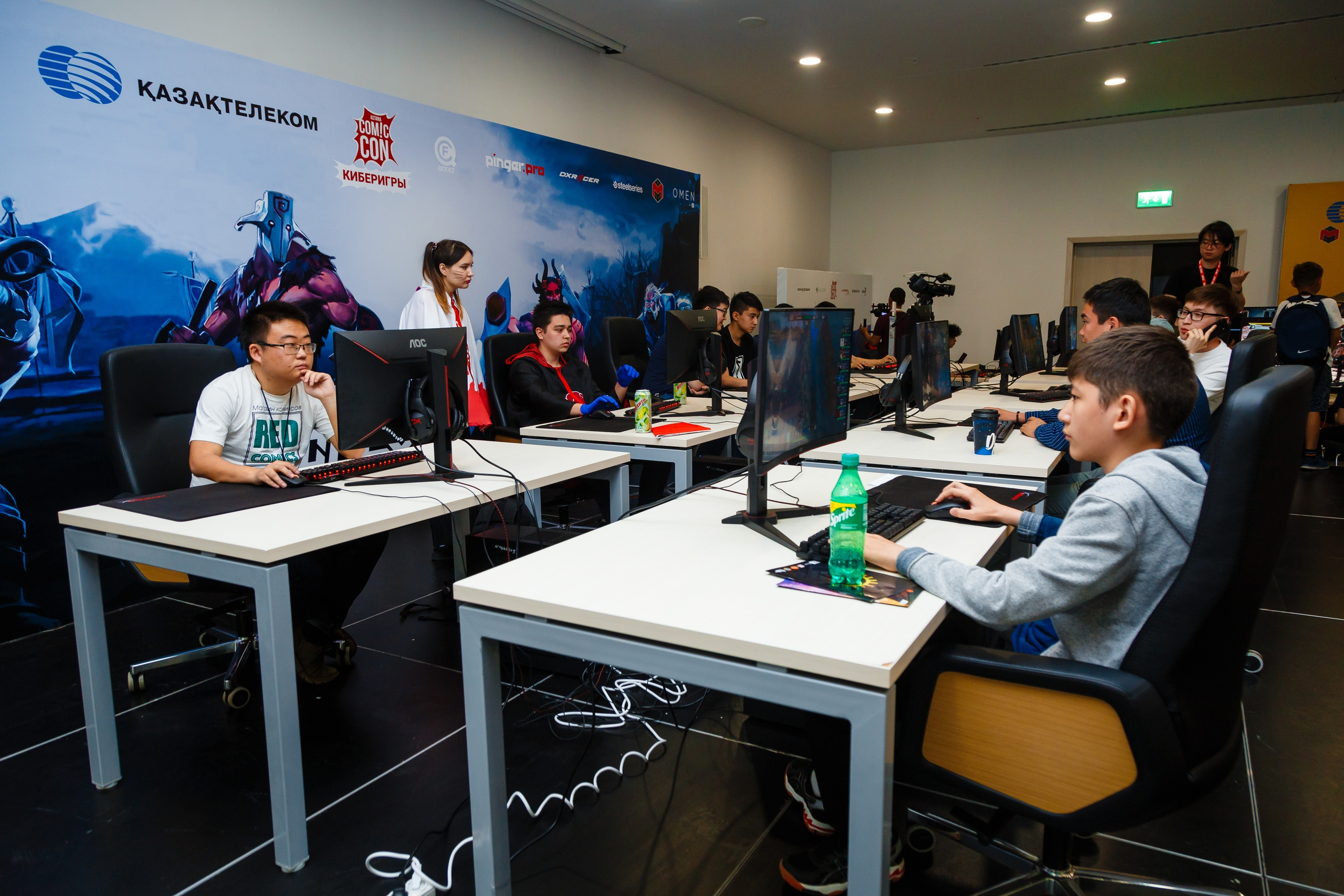
Tournament for Comic Con Astana attendees, 2020

The Qazaq Cybersport Federation was established in 2017 by a group of esports professionals and enthusiasts. In 2018, based on an application submitted by the Federation, esports was included in the official register of sports in Kazakhstan, thereby receiving official recognition.

In 2020, the Federation was granted the status of an accredited national sports federation. It subsequently became a member of the Asian Esports Federation (AESF), which is recognized by the Olympic Council of Asia. In March 2020, the Federation joined the International Esports Federation (IeSF) as its 57th member. This membership allows Kazakhstan to host international tournaments and national qualifying events under the auspices of IESF and to participate in the organization's governance processes. In May 2020, the Federation also became a member of the Global Esports Federation (GEF). On 28 September 2020, it received a certificate of recognition from the National Olympic Committee of the Republic of Kazakhstan.

On 19 May 2022, the Federation entered into a sponsorship agreement with KFC, which supports the Spring Cup competition.

In March 2023, the Federation submitted a bid to host the International Esports Federation (IESF) World Esports Championship in Almaty between 2024 and 2026.

From 2023 to 2025, the Federation continued to organize national and corporate tournaments, including the Cup of the Republic of Kazakhstan in esports and the Qazaqstan Qyzmet Cyber Cup, and to develop educational initiatives such as esports academies and student leagues.

In 2025, the Federation announced the launch of a hybrid esports academy combining online and offline training formats.

In 2026, the Federation became a National Team Partner of the Esports Nations Cup.

== Activities ==
- Development and support of esports in Kazakhstan.
- Promotion of international sports cooperation, including participation of national teams in international competitions.
- Promotion of esports as part of the global sports movement.
- Organization of national competitions and participation in the organization of international tournaments.
- Support for esports broadcasting and streaming.
- Development of regulations governing sports classifications, ranks, and titles in esports.
- Training, certification, and supervision of referees.
- Selection and nomination of athletes and coaches for sports titles and qualifications.
- Organization of educational programmes in esports.

The Federation holds exclusive rights to organize national qualifying events for the World Electronic Sports Games (WESG), organized by Ali Play.

== Projects ==
- Alaman Cup.
- Altel Cyber Games.
- Gorilla Esports.
- Kazakhstan Esports Student League (KESL).
- National Esports Student Association.
- Formation of national teams of Kazakhstan for participation in international competitions. organized by IESF, AESF, GEF, and WESG.
- Esports HUB Academy.
- Pinger.pro (official tournament platform of the Federation).
- 1XBET Esports Hub Accelerator, an esports team and business project accelerator in the CIS region.
