= Ancients (board game) =

Board wargame published in 1986

1st edition published by Good Industries in 1986

Ancients is a board wargame published by Good Industries in 1986 that simulates various historical battles in pre-gunpowder settings.

== Description ==
Ancients is a two-player wargame with rules for low-complexity tactical combat. The game box includes four map sheets to be used with various battles. Various options allow for the inclusion of exotic items such as chariots or elephants. The game includes over 60 scenarios for historical battles from Ancient Greece to the Renaissance. Each scenario only lasts seven turns.

== Gameplay ==
Combat uses a simple alternating system of turns: the first player removes leaders from the board, then moves units. The second player's missile troops fire, then the first player's melee troops attack. Any units that are his are disorganized and cannot attack. After combat, the leaders are replaced, and any disorganized units in touch with the leader are rallied. Once this is finished, the players switch attacking and defensive roles, the second player now getting an opportunity to move and attack.

== Publication history ==
Ancients was designed by Bill Banks who founded Good Industries in 1986 to self-publish the game. Banks also published a companion board game, King of Kings, as well as Ancients II that added naval combat rules and scenarios.

3W became the publisher of Ancients in 1992, and reduced the number of scenarios to 32. 3W also revised and re-published the companion board game, retitling it Imperator.

== Reception ==
Mike Siggins reviewed Ancients for Games International, and was pleasantly surprised by the professional components, given that it was a self-published effort. Siggins found all of the scenarios were well-balanced, and said, "I think Ancients is one of those games, like Squad Leader, that simply 'works'. He concluded by giving it an excellent rating of 5 stars out of 5, saying, "At the price, even with postage from the States, Ancients is one of the best bargains in gaming. The components are very good indeed, the rules are concise and accurate and the system works extremely well."

In Issue 7 of Berg's Review of Games, game designer Richard Berg commented that the game "attempts to combine at least a modicum of flavor and creativity with its simplicity, synthesizing familiar rules into an enjoyable and eminently playable system." After examining the scenarios, Berg was impressed, writing, "With his simple little system, [game designer Bill] Banks has managed to paint some (but certainly not all) broad truths about ancient and medieval warfare." Berg called the game a family hatchback compared to the Maseratis of the wargaming world but concluded that Ancients was "a pretty good way to introduce the uninitiated to our obsession. It's fast, furious, fun that ends quickly, and leaves you wanting more. Bill Banks has managed to keep it simple without becoming overly simplistic."

== Other reviews and commentary ==
- Battleplan #7 (Aug-Sept 1988)
- Fire & Movement #70
- Fire & Movement #88
