= Shax (board game) =

The board used for shax. Pieces are placed on the intersections and players try to get three in a row.

Shax (pronounced /shah/), also known as jar, djelga or mororova in some areas, is a board game played in the Horn of Africa, particularly in Somalia. With its origins dating back centuries, it is still popular today.

The game is usually played by marking a board on the ground, and using stones or sticks as pieces. Shax has had a significant influence on Somali literature, which often mentions gameplay and strategies. In the historical nomadic lifestyle of the Somali people, shax was also utilized as a means of communication between different clans.

== Rules ==
Shax is similar to the game nine men's morris and uses the same board. However, in shax, mills formed during placement do not immediately result in the removal of opposing pieces. When placement is finished, if any mills have been formed, the player who formed the first one may remove one opposing piece, and the other player may do the same whether they formed a mill or not. Play then continues as before. If no mills were formed during placement, the second player to move during placement is the first to move after it.

If at any time a player has no moves, their opponent is required to open an intersection by moving. If this freeing movement happens to form a mill, no piece may be removed. The "flying" rule is not used.

== See also ==
- Turup
