= International Esports Federation =

Global esports organization

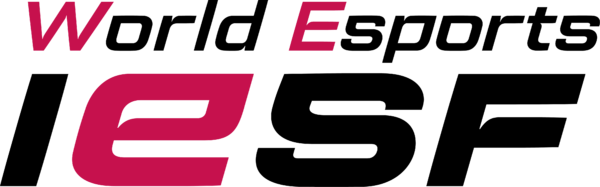
- Logo

- Member nations per April 2024
- Abbreviation: IESF
- Formation: August 11, 2008; 18 years ago
- Type: Sports federation
- Headquarters: Busan, South Korea
- Official language: English
- President: Vlad Marinescu
- Main organ: General Assembly
- Website: https://iesf.org

The International Esports Federation (IESF) is a global organization based in South Korea whose mission it is to have esports recognized as a legitimate sport.

== Members ==
As of July 2026, there are 152 member states of the IESF, including:

Africa Electronic Sport Association (35)

- Algeria
- Benin
- Botswana
- Burkina Faso
- Cameroon
- Central African Republic
- Chad
- Congo
- Djibouti
- DR Congo
- Egypt
- Equatorial Guinea
- Eswatini
- Gabon
- Gambia
- Ghana
- Guinea
- Ivory Coast
- Kenya
- Libya
- Madagascar
- Mali
- Mauritania
- Mauritius
- Morocco
- Namibia
- Niger
- Nigeria
- Senegal
- Somalia
- South Africa
- South Sudan
- Tanzania
- Tunisia
- Zimbabwe

Pan American Electronic Sports Confederation (24)

- Argentina
- Bahamas
- Bolivia
- Brazil
- Canada
- Chile
- Colombia
- Costa Rica
- Cuba
- Dominican Republic
- Ecuador
- Guadeloupe
- Guatemala
- Haiti
- Honduras
- Jamaica
- Mexico
- Panama
- Peru
- Suriname
- Trinidad and Tobago
- United States
- Uruguay
- Venezuela

Asian Electronic Sports Federation (43)

- Afghanistan
- Bahrain
- Bangladesh
- Bhutan
- Brunei
- Cambodia
- China
- Chinese Taipei
- Hong Kong
- India
- Indonesia
- Iran
- Iraq
- Japan
- Jordan
- Kazakhstan
- Kuwait
- Kyrgyzstan
- Laos
- Lebanon
- Macau
- Malaysia
- Maldives
- Mongolia
- Myanmar
- Nepal
- Oman
- Pakistan
- Palestine
- Philippines
- Qatar
- Saudi Arabia
- South Korea
- Sri Lanka
- Syria
- Tajikistan
- Thailand
- Timor Leste
- Turkmenistan
- United Arab Emirates
- Uzbekistan
- Vietnam
- Yemen

European Esports Federation (47)

- Albania
- Armenia
- Austria
- Azerbaijan
- Belarus
- Belgium
- Bosnia and Herzegovina
- Bulgaria
- Croatia
- Czech Republic
- Denmark
- Estonia
- Finland
- France
- Georgia
- Germany
- Gibraltar
- Greece
- Hungary
- Iceland
- Ireland
- Israel
- Italy
- Kosovo
- Latvia
- Lithuania
- Luxembourg
- Malta
- Moldova
- Monaco
- Montenegro
- Netherlands
- North Macedonia
- Norway
- Poland
- Portugal
- Romania
- Russia
- San Marino
- Serbia
- Slovakia
- Slovenia
- Spain
- Sweden
- Switzerland
- Turkey
- Ukraine
- Wales

Oceania (3)

- Australia
- Guam
- New Zealand

== History ==
The International Esports Federation (IeSF) was established on August 8, 2008, by nine esports associations from Denmark, South Korea, Germany, Austria, Belgium, The Netherlands, Switzerland, Vietnam, and Taiwan. In November of the same year, the organization held its inaugural general meeting.

A year later, on December 12, 2009, the IeSF hosted its first international tournaments. These tournaments included the "IeSF Challenge" in 2009, followed by the "IeSF Grand Finals" in 2010, and the "IeSF World Championship" starting from 2011 and onward.

In 2012, IeSF introduced the first-ever esports tournament for women during the IeSF 2012 World Championship.

On 7 July 2013, IeSF was chosen as the representative for the electronic sports discipline at the 4th Asian Indoor and Martial Arts Games, marking the first time esports had a presence in an Olympic event.

In May 2013, IeSF gain recognition as the official signatory of the World Anti-Doping Agency within the branch of esports.

In July 2013, IeSF submitted an application to join Sport Accord, with expectations of becoming a temporary member in April 2014.

In November 2013, the IeSF hosted the IeSF 2013 World Championship and the 2013 General Meeting in Bucharest, Romania, a significant departure from their usual South Korea location.

In May 2014, the IeSF was granted membership by the Trim and Fitness International Sport for All Association (TAFISA) and announced its participation in the 2016 TAFISA World Games for All, to be held in Jakarta.

In 2014, IeSF initially implemented gender-based restrictions in the Hearthstone tournament, but later amended its policy to merge the sections into open-for-all tournaments while still maintaining female-only tournaments with smaller prize pools.

During the 2015 World Championship, an esports panel was hosted with international sports society representatives to discuss the potential recognition of esports as a legitimate sporting activity worldwide.

In July 2016, Macau became the 56th member nation of the IESF.

In 2018, IESF voted to accept the United States Esports Federation (USEF) as a full member, establishing USEF as the officially recognized national governing body for esports in the United States.

In a bid to expand into the Middle East, the IeSF signed a memorandum of understanding (MoU) with the UAE's Motivate Media Group, the parent company of "Gulf Business," as the esports community in the Middle East continued to grow, with over 300 million gamers in the region.

The IeSF expanded further with the inclusion of new member federations, such as Colombia's Federación Colombiana de Deportes Electrónicos (FEDECOLDE), Kazakhstan's Qazaq Cybersport Federation (QCF), Turkey's Turkish Esports Federation (TESFED), and Ukraine's Federation of E-Sport of Ukraine (UESF), bringing the total member count to 60, spanning six continents.

In October 2023, IESF appointed Prince Faisal bin Bandar bin Sultan Al Saud, a member of the Saudi Arabian royal family, as its president.

In 2024, the International Esports Federation received a record number of bids from over 30 cities across six continents to host the 2025 and 2026 World Esports Championship and Regional Qualifiers. IESF is reviewing the bids based on criteria such as sustainability and inclusivity. General Secretary Boban Totovski noted the rapid growth of IESF events and the significant value they bring to host nations. The 2024 World Esports Championship took place in Riyadh, Saudi Arabia.

=== World Esports Championships ===
Year	Title	Location	Esports titles	Note
2009	IeSF 2009 Challenge	(South Korea) Taebaek	FIFA Online, Warcraft3, A.V.A	
2010	IeSF Grand Final	(South Korea) Daegu	FIFA Online, WarCraft III: The Frozen Throne	
2011	IeSF World Championship	(South Korea) Andong	StarCraft II, FIFA Online	
2012	IeSF World Championship	(South Korea) Cheonan	Alliance of Valiant Arms, StarCraft II, Tekken Tag Tournament 2	
2013	IeSF World Championship	(Romania) Bucharest	League of Legends, StarCraft II, Tekken Tag Tournament 2, Alliance of Valiant Arms	
2014	Esports World Championship 2014	(Azerbaijan) Baku	Dota 2, Hearthstone, Ultra Street Fighter IV, StarCraft II, Tekken Tag Tournament 2	
2015	Esports World Championship 2015	(South Korea) Seoul	League of Legends, StarCraft II, Hearthstone	
2016	Esports World Championship 2016	(Indonesia) Jakarta	Counter-Strike: Global Offensive, League of Legends, Hearthstone	
2017	Esports World Championship 2017	(South Korea) Busan	Counter-Strike: Global Offensive, League of Legends, Tekken 7	
2018	Esports World Championship 2018	(Taiwan) Kaohsiung	Counter-Strike: Global Offensive, League of Legends, Tekken 7	
2019	Esports World Championship 2019	(South Korea) Seoul	Dota 2, Tekken 7, eFootball Pro Evolution Soccer 2020	
2020	Esports World Championship 2020	(Israel) Eilat	Dota 2, Tekken 7, eFootball Pro Evolution Soccer 2020	
2021	Esports World Championship 2021	(Israel) Eilat	Dota 2, Counter-Strike: Global Offensive, Tekken 7, eFootball	
2022	World Esports Championship 2022	(Indonesia) Bali	Dota 2, Counter-Strike: Global Offensive, Tekken 7, eFootball, PUBG Mobile, Mobile Legends: Bang Bang	
2023	World Esports Championship 2023	(Romania) Iași	Counter-Strike: Global Offensive, Dota 2, Tekken 7, eFootball, PUBG Mobile, Mobile Legends: Bang Bang	
2024	World Esports Championship 2024	(Saudi Arabia) Riyadh	Counter-Strike 2, Dota 2, eFootball, PUBG Mobile, Mobile Legends: Bang Bang	
2025	World Esports Championship 2025	(Malaysia) Kuala Lumpur	Mobile Legends: Bang Bang	
2026	World Esports Championship 2026	Indonesia	Counter-Strike 2, Dota 2, eFootball, PUBG Mobile, Mobile Legends: Bang Bang	
2027	World Esports Championship 2027	Kazakhstan	TBA	

== See also ==
- Global Esports Federation
